= List of accolades received by No Country for Old Men =

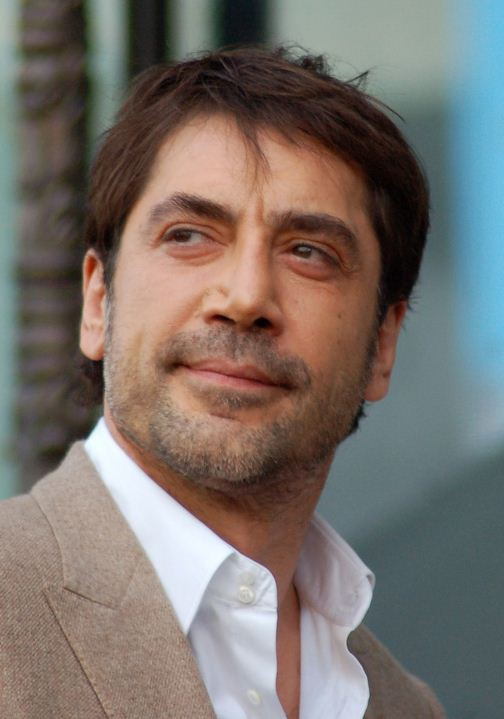
- Javier Bardem received several awards and nominations for his supporting role in the film.
Accolades
Award	Won	Nominated
Academy Awards	4	8
American Cinema Editors	0	1
American Society of Cinematographers	0	1
Art Directors Guild	1	1
Australian Film Critics Association	1	1
Boston Society of Film Critics	2	2
British Academy Film Awards	3	9
Cannes Film Festival	0	1
Casting Society of America	1	1
Chicago Film Critics Association	4	5
Cinema Audio Society	1	1
Critics' Choice Movie Awards	3	5
Dallas–Fort Worth Film Critics Association	3	3
David di Donatello Awards	1	1
Directors Guild of America	1	1
Film Critics Circle of Australia	1	1
Florida Film Critics Circle	4	4
Golden Globe Awards	2	4
Golden Trailer Awards	2	2
Guldbagge Award	1	1
Key Art Awards	1	1
London Film Critics Circle	2	4
Motion Picture Sound Editors	2	2
MTV Movie Awards	0	1
National Board of Review	3	3
New York Film Critics Circle	4	4
Online Film Critics Society	6	7
Producers Guild of America Awards	1	1
San Diego Film Critics Society	4	4
San Francisco Film Critics Circle	1	1
Satellite Awards	2	6
Screen Actors Guild Awards	2	3
St. Louis Gateway Film Critics Association	2	7
Toronto Film Critics Association	4	4
Vancouver Film Critics Circle	3	3
Washington D.C. Area Film Critics Association	4	4
Writers Guild of America Awards	1	1
- Total number of awards and nominations (Note: Certain award groups do not simply award one winner. They recognize several different recipients and have runners-up. Since this is a specific recognition and is different from losing an award, runner-up mentions are considered wins in this award tally.)
Totals	77	110
- References

No Country for Old Men is a 2007 American neo-Western thriller film produced, directed, written, and edited by Joel and Ethan Coen. Based on Cormac McCarthy's novel of the same name, the film is about an ordinary man to whom chance delivers a fortune that is not his, and the ensuing cat-and-mouse drama as the paths of three men intertwine in the desert landscape of 1980 West Texas. The film stars Josh Brolin, Tommy Lee Jones, and Javier Bardem, with Woody Harrelson, Kelly Macdonald, Garret Dillahunt, Tess Harper, and Beth Grant in featured roles.

The film premiered at the 60th Cannes Film Festival on May 19, 2007, where it was nominated for the Palme d'Or. After a successful screening at the Toronto International Film Festival, Miramax and Paramount Vantage initially gave the film a limited release in 28 theaters in the United States on November 9. The film was later given a release in 860 theaters in the United States and Canada on November 21. No Country for Old Men has grossed a worldwide total of over $172 million on a production budget of $25 million. Rotten Tomatoes, a review aggregator, surveyed 265 reviews and judged 93 percent to be positive.

No Country for Old Men garnered awards and nominations in a variety of categories, with particular praise for its direction, screenplay, and Bardem's performance. At the 80th Academy Awards, the film received eight nominations, the most nominations at the ceremony tied with There Will Be Blood. It went on to win four awards including Best Picture, Best Director, (Joel and Ethan Coen), Best Supporting Actor (Bardem), and Best Adapted Screenplay (Ethan and Joel Coen). The Coen brothers became the second pair of individuals to win Best Directing for helming the same film. No Country for Old Men earned four nominations at the 65th Golden Globe Awards, winning for Best Screenplay for the Coen brothers and Golden Globe for Best Supporting Actor for Bardem. At the 61st British Academy Film Awards, the film received nine nominations and won for Best Direction, Best Supporting Actor, and Best Cinematography.

At the Producers Guild of America Awards, No Country for Old Men won for Best Theatrical Motion Picture. The Coen brothers received the Outstanding Directing – Feature Film Award from the Directors Guild of America. The cast garnered the Screen Actors Guild Award for Outstanding Performance by a Cast in a Motion Picture, and the Coens' screenplay won the Writers Guild of America Award for Best Adapted Screenplay. The National Board of Review named it the Best Film. The American Film Institute and included the film in its annual listing of the top ten films of 2007.

== Accolades ==
Award	Date of ceremony	Category	Recipient(s) and nominee(s)	Result	Ref.
Academy Awards	February 24, 2008	Best Picture	Scott Rudin, Joel and Ethan Coen	Won	
Academy Awards	February 24, 2008	Best Director	Joel and Ethan Coen	Won	
Academy Awards	February 24, 2008	Best Supporting Actor	Javier Bardem	Won	
Academy Awards	February 24, 2008	Best Adapted Screenplay	Joel and Ethan Coen	Won	
Academy Awards	February 24, 2008	Best Cinematography	Roger Deakins	Nominated	
Academy Awards	February 24, 2008	Best Film Editing	Joel and Ethan Coen (as Roderick Jaynes)	Nominated	
Academy Awards	February 24, 2008	Best Sound Editing	Skip Lievsay	Nominated	
Academy Awards	February 24, 2008	Best Sound Mixing	Skip Lievsay, Craig Berkey, Greg Orloff, and Peter Kurland	Nominated	
American Cinema Editors	February 18, 2008	Best Edited Feature Film – Dramatic	Joel and Ethan Coen (as Roderick Jaynes)	Nominated	
American Society of Cinematographers	January 26, 2008	Outstanding Achievement in Cinematography	Roger Deakins	Nominated	
Art Directors Guild	February 18, 2008	ADG Excellence in Production Design Awards	Jess Gonchor	Won	
Australian Film Critics Association	January 22, 2008	Best Overseas Film	No Country for Old Men	Won	
Boston Society of Film Critics	December 11, 2007	Best Picture	No Country for Old Men	Won	
Boston Society of Film Critics	December 11, 2007	Best Supporting Actor	Javier Bardem	Won	
BAFTA Awards	February 10, 2008	Best Cinematography	Roger Deakins	Won	
BAFTA Awards	February 10, 2008	Best Direction	Joel and Ethan Coen	Won	
BAFTA Awards	February 10, 2008	Best Supporting Actor	Javier Bardem	Won	
BAFTA Awards	February 10, 2008	Best Editing	Joel and Ethan Coen (as Roderick Jaynes)	Nominated	
BAFTA Awards	February 10, 2008	Best Film	Scott Rudin, Joel and Ethan Coen	Nominated	
BAFTA Awards	February 10, 2008	Best Adapted Screenplay	Joel and Ethan Coen	Nominated	
BAFTA Awards	February 10, 2008	Best Sound	Peter F. Kurland, Skip Lievsay, Craig Berkey, and Greg Orloff	Nominated	
BAFTA Awards	February 10, 2008	Best Supporting Actor	Tommy Lee Jones	Nominated	
BAFTA Awards	February 10, 2008	Best Supporting Actress	Kelly Macdonald	Nominated	
Critics' Choice Movie Award	January 7, 2008	Best Director	Joel and Ethan Coen	Won	
Critics' Choice Movie Award	January 7, 2008	Best Film	No Country for Old Men	Won	
Critics' Choice Movie Award	January 7, 2008	Best Supporting Actor	Javier Bardem	Won	
Critics' Choice Movie Award	January 7, 2008	Best Cast	No Country for Old Men	Nominated	
Critics' Choice Movie Award	January 7, 2008	Best Writer	Joel and Ethan Coen	Nominated	
Cannes Film Festival	May 27, 2007	Palme d'Or	No Country for Old Men	Nominated	
Casting Society of America Awards	November 11, 2008	Outstanding Achievement in Casting – Studio Feature – Drama	Ellen Chenoweth and Jo Edna Boldin	Won	
Chicago Film Critics Association Awards	December 13, 2007	Best Director	Joel and Ethan Coen	Won	
Chicago Film Critics Association Awards	December 13, 2007	Best Picture	No Country for Old Men	Won	
Chicago Film Critics Association Awards	December 13, 2007	Best Adapted Screenplay	Joel and Ethan Coen	Won	
Chicago Film Critics Association Awards	December 13, 2007	Best Supporting Actor	Javier Bardem	Won	
Chicago Film Critics Association Awards	December 13, 2007	Best Cinematography	Roger Deakins	Nominated	
Cinema Audio Society	February 16, 2008	Best Sound Mixing for Motion Pictures	Peter F. Kurland (Production mixer), Skip Lievsay, Craig Berkey, and Greg Orloff (Re-recording mixers)	Won	
Dallas–Fort Worth Film Critics Association Awards	December 17, 2007	Best Director	Joel and Ethan Coen	Won	
Dallas–Fort Worth Film Critics Association Awards	December 17, 2007	Best Film	Joel and Ethan Coen	Won	
Dallas–Fort Worth Film Critics Association Awards	December 17, 2007	Best Supporting Actor	Javier Bardem	Won	
David di Donatello Awards	April 18, 2008	Best Foreign Film	Joel and Ethan Coen	Won	
Directors Guild of America Awards	January 26, 2008	Outstanding Achievement in Feature Film	Joel and Ethan Coen	Won	
Film Critics Circle of Australia	February 1, 2008	Best Foreign Film – English Language	Joel and Ethan Coen	Won	
Florida Film Critics Circle Awards	December 12, 2007	Best Cinematography	Roger Deakins	Won	
Florida Film Critics Circle Awards	December 12, 2007	Best Director	Joel and Ethan Coen	Won	
Florida Film Critics Circle Awards	December 12, 2007	Best Film	Joel and Ethan Coen	Won	
Florida Film Critics Circle Awards	December 12, 2007	Best Supporting Actor	Javier Bardem	Won	
Golden Eagle Award	January 23, 2009	Best Foreign Language Film	No Country for Old Men	Nominated	
Golden Globe Awards	January 13, 2008	Best Screenplay	Joel and Ethan Coen	Won	
Golden Globe Awards	January 13, 2008	Best Supporting Actor	Javier Bardem	Won	
Golden Globe Awards	January 13, 2008	Best Director	Joel and Ethan Coen	Nominated	
Golden Globe Awards	January 13, 2008	Best Motion Picture – Drama	No Country for Old Men	Nominated	
Golden Trailer Awards	May 8, 2008	Best Drama	No Country for Old Men	Won	
Golden Trailer Awards	May 8, 2008	Best Thriller TV Spot	Friend-o spot	Won	
Guldbagge Awards	January 12, 2009	Best Foreign Film	No Country for Old Men	Nominated	
Japan Academy Prize	February 20, 2009	Best Foreign Film	No Country for Old Men	Nominated	
Key Art Awards	June 13, 2008	Best Campaign of the Year	No Country for Old Men	Won	
London Film Critics' Circle	February 8, 2008	British Supporting Actress of the Year	Kelly Macdonald	Won	
London Film Critics' Circle	February 8, 2008	Film of the Year	Joel and Ethan Coen	Won	
London Film Critics' Circle	February 8, 2008	Director of the Year	Joel and Ethan Coen	Nominated	
London Film Critics' Circle	February 8, 2008	Screenwriter of the Year	Joel and Ethan Coen	Nominated	
MTV Movie Awards	June 1, 2008	Best Villain	Javier Bardem	Nominated	
Motion Picture Sound Editors	February 23, 2008	Best Sound Editing: Dialogue and ADR for Feature Film	Skip Lievsay and Craig Berkey (Sound designer); Byron Wilson (Supervising dialogue editor); Kenton Jakub (Supervising ADR editor)	Nominated	
Motion Picture Sound Editors	February 23, 2008	Best Sound Editing: Sound Effects and Foley for Feature Film	Skip Lievsay (Supervising sound editor); Craig Berkey (Sound design), Derek Vanderhorst (Foley editor), Catherine Harper and Christopher Moriana (Doley artist)	Nominated	
National Board of Review Awards	January 15, 2008	Best Cast	No Country for Old Men	Won	
National Board of Review Awards	January 15, 2008	Best Film	No Country for Old Men	Won	
National Board of Review Awards	January 15, 2008	Best Adapted Screenplay	Joel and Ethan Coen	Won	
New York Film Critics Circle Awards	January 6, 2008	Best Director	Joel and Ethan Coen	Won	
New York Film Critics Circle Awards	January 6, 2008	Best Film	No Country for Old Men	Won	
New York Film Critics Circle Awards	January 6, 2008	Best Screenplay	Joel and Ethan Coen	Won	
New York Film Critics Circle Awards	January 6, 2008	Best Supporting Actor	Javier Bardem	Won	
Online Film Critics Society Awards	January 9, 2008	Best Cinematography	Roger Deakins	Won	
Online Film Critics Society Awards	January 9, 2008	Best Director	Joel and Ethan Coen	Won	
Online Film Critics Society Awards	January 9, 2008	Best Editing	Joel and Ethan Coen	Won	
Online Film Critics Society Awards	January 9, 2008	Best Picture	No Country for Old Men	Won	
Online Film Critics Society Awards	January 9, 2008	Best Adapted Screenplay	Joel and Ethan Coen	Won	
Online Film Critics Society Awards	January 9, 2008	Best Supporting Actor	Javier Bardem	Won	
Online Film Critics Society Awards	January 9, 2008	Best Supporting Actress	Kelly Macdonald	Nominated	
Producers Guild of America Awards	February 8, 2008	Motion Picture Producer of the Year Award	Scott Rudin, Joel and Ethan Coen	Won	
San Diego Film Critics Society Awards	December 17, 2007	Best Cinematography	Roger Deakins	Won	
San Diego Film Critics Society Awards	December 17, 2007	Best Cast	No Country for Old Men	Won	
San Diego Film Critics Society Awards	December 17, 2007	Best Film	No Country for Old Men	Won	
San Diego Film Critics Society Awards	December 17, 2007	Best Supporting Actor	Tommy Lee Jones	Won	
San Francisco Film Critics Circle Awards	December 10, 2007	Best Director	Joel and Ethan Coen	Won	
Satellite Awards	December 16, 2007	Best Director	Joel and Ethan Coen	Won	
Satellite Awards	December 16, 2007	Best Film – Drama	No Country for Old Men	Won	
Satellite Awards	December 16, 2007	Best Actor – Drama	Josh Brolin	Nominated	
Satellite Awards	December 16, 2007	Best Supporting Actor	Javier Bardem	Nominated	
Satellite Awards	December 16, 2007	Best Editing	Joel and Ethan Coen	Nominated	
Satellite Awards	December 16, 2007	Best Adapted Screenplay	Joel and Ethan Coen	Nominated	
Screen Actors Guild Awards	January 27, 2008	Outstanding Performance by a Cast in a Motion Picture	Javier Bardem, Josh Brolin, Garret Dillahunt, Tess Harper, Woody Harrelson, Tommy Lee Jones, and Kelly Macdonald	Won	
Screen Actors Guild Awards	January 27, 2008	Outstanding Performance by a Male Actor in a Supporting Role	Javier Bardem	Won	
Screen Actors Guild Awards	January 27, 2008	Outstanding Performance by a Male Actor in a Supporting Role	Tommy Lee Jones	Nominated	
St. Louis Gateway Film Critics Association Awards	December 24, 2007	Best Cinematograpny	Roger Deakins	Nominated	
St. Louis Gateway Film Critics Association Awards	December 24, 2007	Best Director	Joel and Ethan Coen	Won	
St. Louis Gateway Film Critics Association Awards	December 24, 2007	Best Picture	No Country for Old Men	Won	
St. Louis Gateway Film Critics Association Awards	December 24, 2007	Best Screenplay	Joel and Ethan Coen	Nominated	
St. Louis Gateway Film Critics Association Awards	December 24, 2007	Best Supporting Actor	Javier Bardem	Nominated	
St. Louis Gateway Film Critics Association Awards	December 24, 2007	Best Supporting Actor	Josh Brolin	Nominated	
St. Louis Gateway Film Critics Association Awards	December 24, 2007	Best Supporting Actor	Tommy Lee Jones	Nominated	
Toronto Film Critics Association Awards	December 18, 2007	Best Director	Joel and Ethan Coen	Won	
Toronto Film Critics Association Awards	December 18, 2007	Best Picture	No Country for Old Men	Won	
Toronto Film Critics Association Awards	December 18, 2007	Best Screenplay	Joel and Ethan Coen	Won	
Toronto Film Critics Association Awards	December 18, 2007	Best Supporting Actor	Javier Bardem	Won	
Vancouver Film Critics Circle Awards	February 11, 2008	Best Director	Joel and Ethan Coen	Won	
Vancouver Film Critics Circle Awards	February 11, 2008	Best Film	No Country for Old Men	Won	
Vancouver Film Critics Circle Awards	February 11, 2008	Best Supporting Actor	Javier Bardem	Won	
Washington DC Area Film Critics Association Awards	December 10, 2007	Best Cast	No Country for Old Men	Won	
Washington DC Area Film Critics Association Awards	December 10, 2007	Best Director	Joel and Ethan Coen	Won	
Washington DC Area Film Critics Association Awards	December 10, 2007	Best Picture	No Country for Old Men	Won	
Washington DC Area Film Critics Association Awards	December 10, 2007	Best Supporting Actor	Javier Bardem	Won	
Writers Guild of America Awards	February 9, 2008	Best Adapted Screenplay	Joel and Ethan Coen	Won	

== See also ==
- 2007 in film
