= Dallas–Fort Worth Film Critics Association Awards 2007 =

Annual US film awards ceremony

13th Dallas-Fort Worth Film Critics Association Awards
- Date: December 17, 2007
- Location: Dallas, Texas
- Country: United States
- Presented by: Dallas-Fort Worth Film Critics Association
- Website: dfwfilmcritics.net

The 13th Dallas–Fort Worth Film Critics Association Awards, given by the Dallas-Fort Worth Film Critics Association on 17 December 2007, honored the best in film for 2007.

== Top 10 films ==
1. No Country for Old Men (Academy Award for Best Picture)
2. Juno
3. There Will Be Blood
4. Atonement
5. Michael Clayton
6. Into the Wild
7. The Diving Bell and the Butterfly (Le scaphandre et le papillon)
8. The Kite Runner
9. The Assassination of Jesse James by the Coward Robert Ford
10. Charlie Wilson's War

== Winners ==
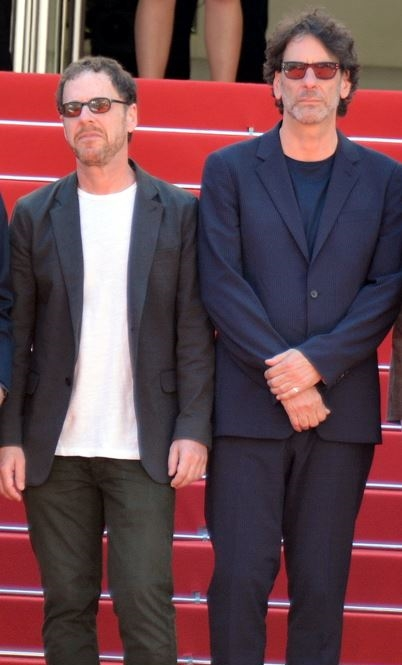
Coen brothers, Best Director winners

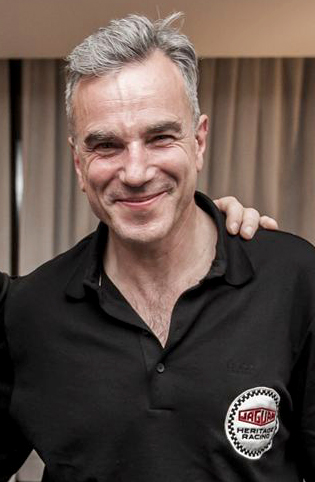
Daniel Day-Lewis, Best Actor winner

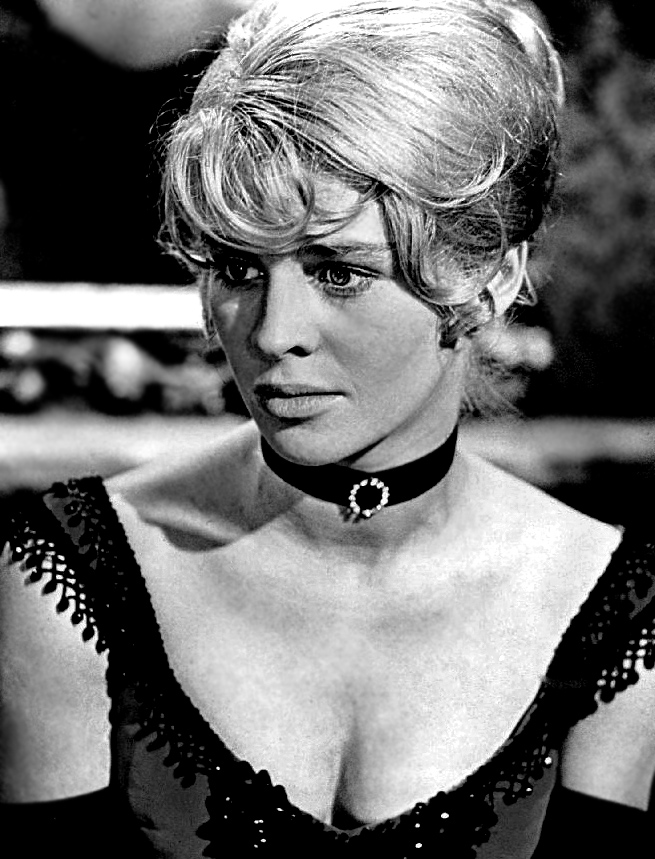
Julie Christie, Best Actress winner

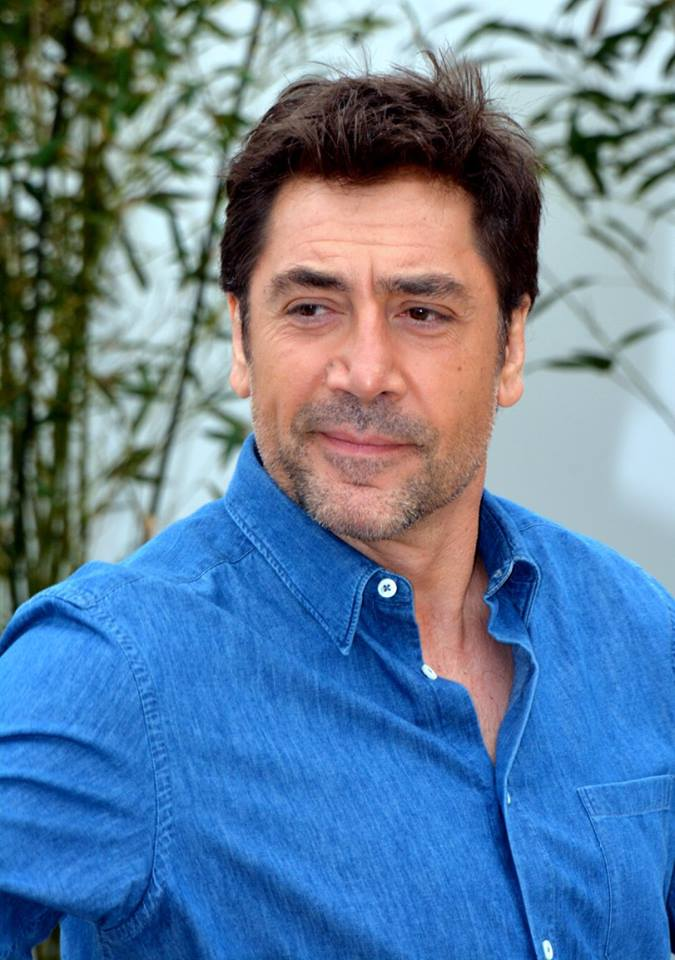
Javier Bardem, Best Supporting Actor winner

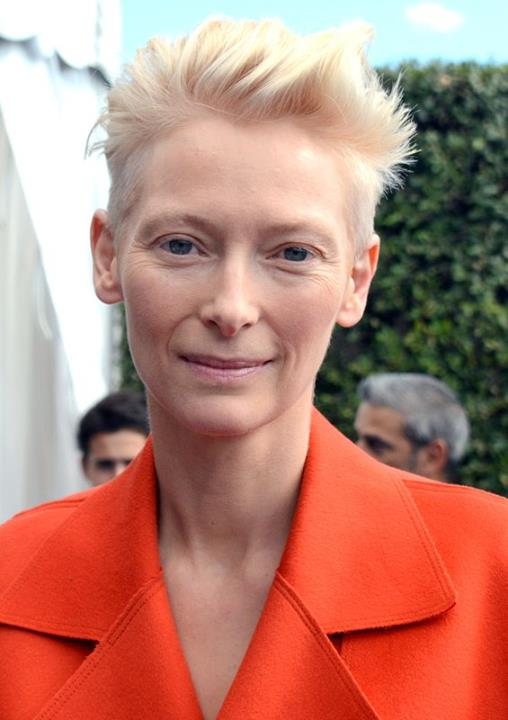
Tilda Swinton, Best Supporting Actress winner

- Best Actor:
  - Daniel Day-Lewis – There Will Be Blood
- Best Actress:
  - Julie Christie – Away from Her
- Best Animated Film:
  - Ratatouille
- Best Cinematography:
  - The Assassination of Jesse James by the Coward Robert Ford – Roger Deakins
- Best Director:
  - Joel Coen and Ethan Coen – No Country for Old Men
- Best Documentary Film:
  - The King of Kong: A Fistful of Quarters
- Best Film:
  - No Country for Old Men
- Best Foreign Language Film:
  - The Diving Bell and the Butterfly (Le scaphandre et le papillon) • France
- Best Screenplay:
  - Juno – Diablo Cody
- Best Supporting Actor:
  - Javier Bardem – No Country for Old Men
- Best Supporting Actress:
  - Tilda Swinton – Michael Clayton
