= San Francisco Film Critics Circle Awards 2007 =

Annual US film awards ceremony

6th San Francisco Film Awards

December 11, 2007

Best Picture:
The Assassination of Jesse James by the Coward Robert Ford

The 6th San Francisco Film Critics Circle Awards, honoring the best in film for 2007, were given on 10 December 2007.

== Winners ==
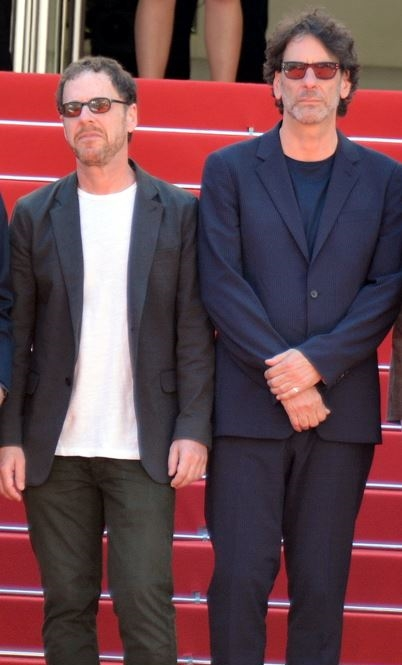
Coen brothers, Best Director winners

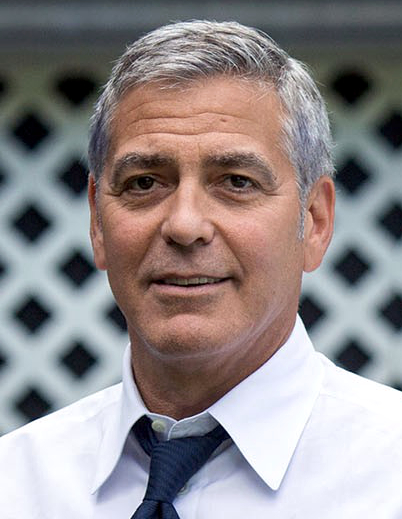
George Clooney, Best Actor winner

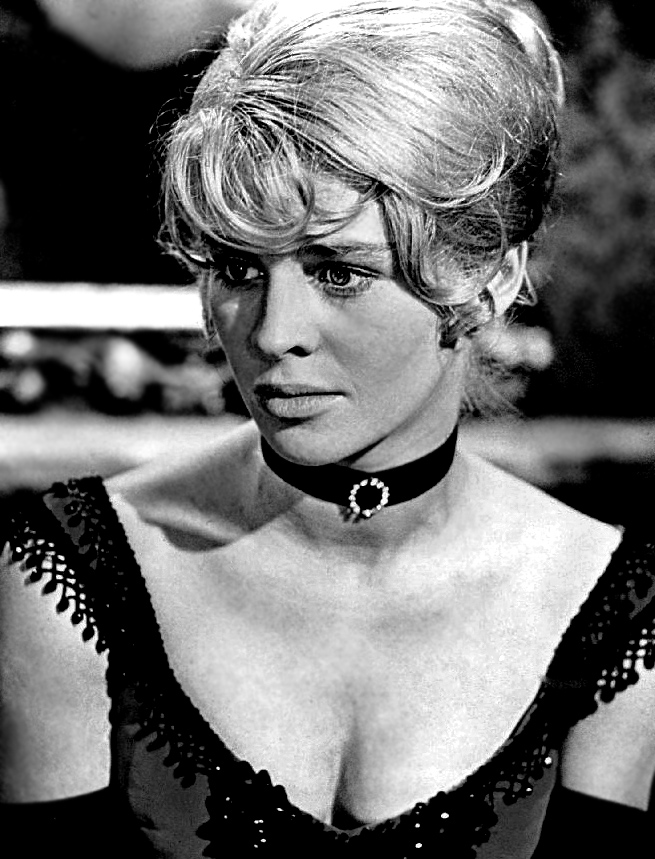
Julie Christie, Best Actress winner

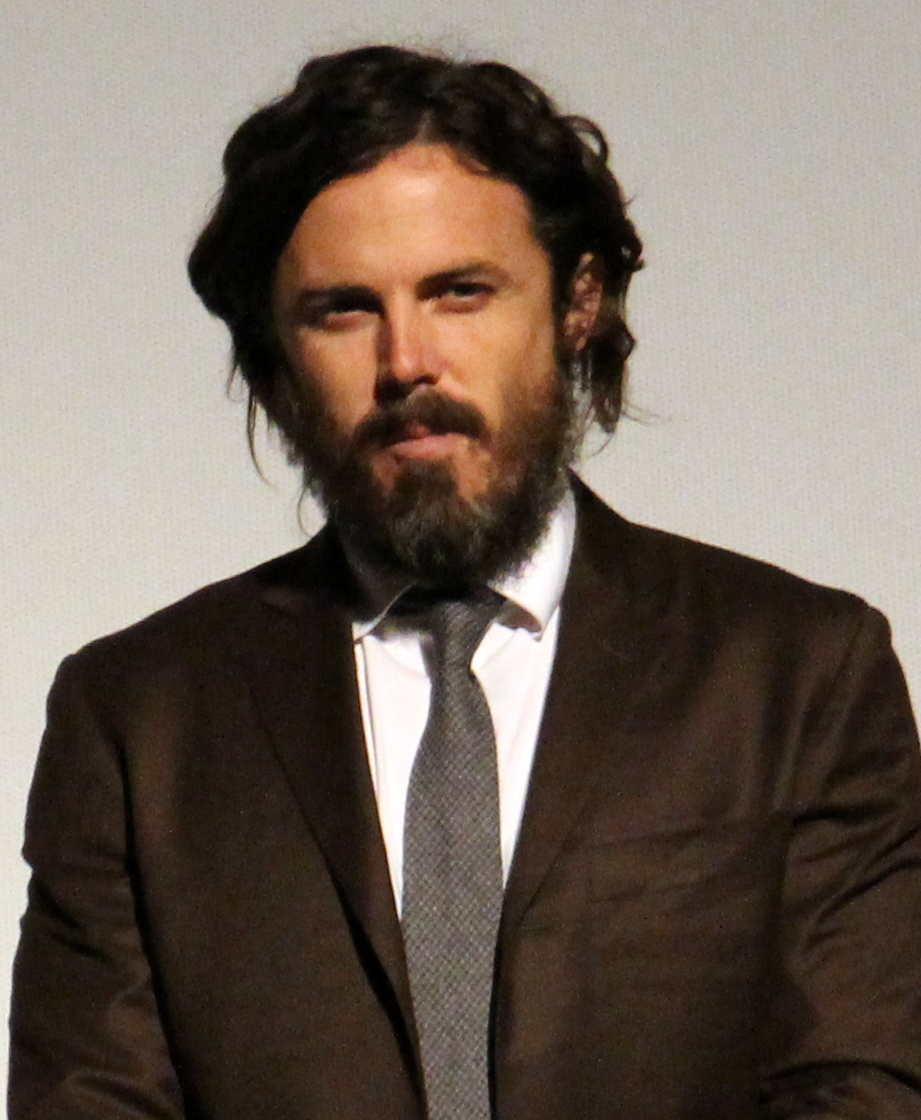
Casey Affleck, Best Supporting Actor winner

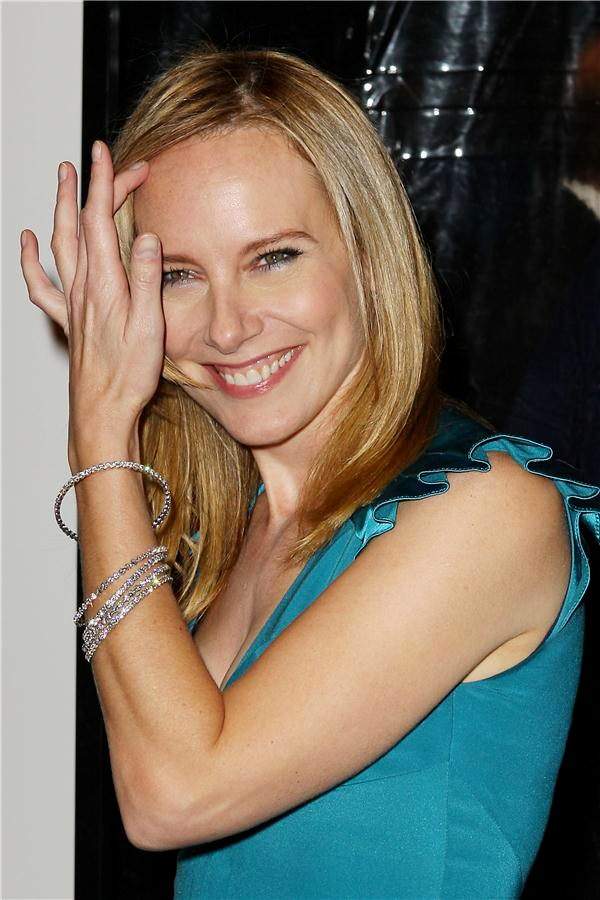
Amy Ryan, Best Supporting Actress winner

- Best Picture:
  - The Assassination of Jesse James by the Coward Robert Ford
- Best Director:
  - Joel and Ethan Coen - No Country for Old Men
- Best Original Screenplay:
  - The Savages - Tamara Jenkins
- Best Adapted Screenplay:
  - Away from Her - Sarah Polley
- Best Actor:
  - George Clooney - Michael Clayton
- Best Actress:
  - Julie Christie - Away from Her
- Best Supporting Actor:
  - Casey Affleck - The Assassination of Jesse James by the Coward Robert Ford
- Best Supporting Actress:
  - Amy Ryan - Gone Baby Gone
- Best Foreign Language Film:
  - The Diving Bell and the Butterfly (Le scaphandre et le papillon) • France/United States
- Best Documentary:
  - No End in Sight
- Marlon Riggs Award (for courage & vision in the Bay Area film community):
  - Lynn Hershman Leeson
- Special Citation:
  - Colma: The Musical
