= Washington D.C. Area Film Critics Association Award for Best Actress =

Annual US film award

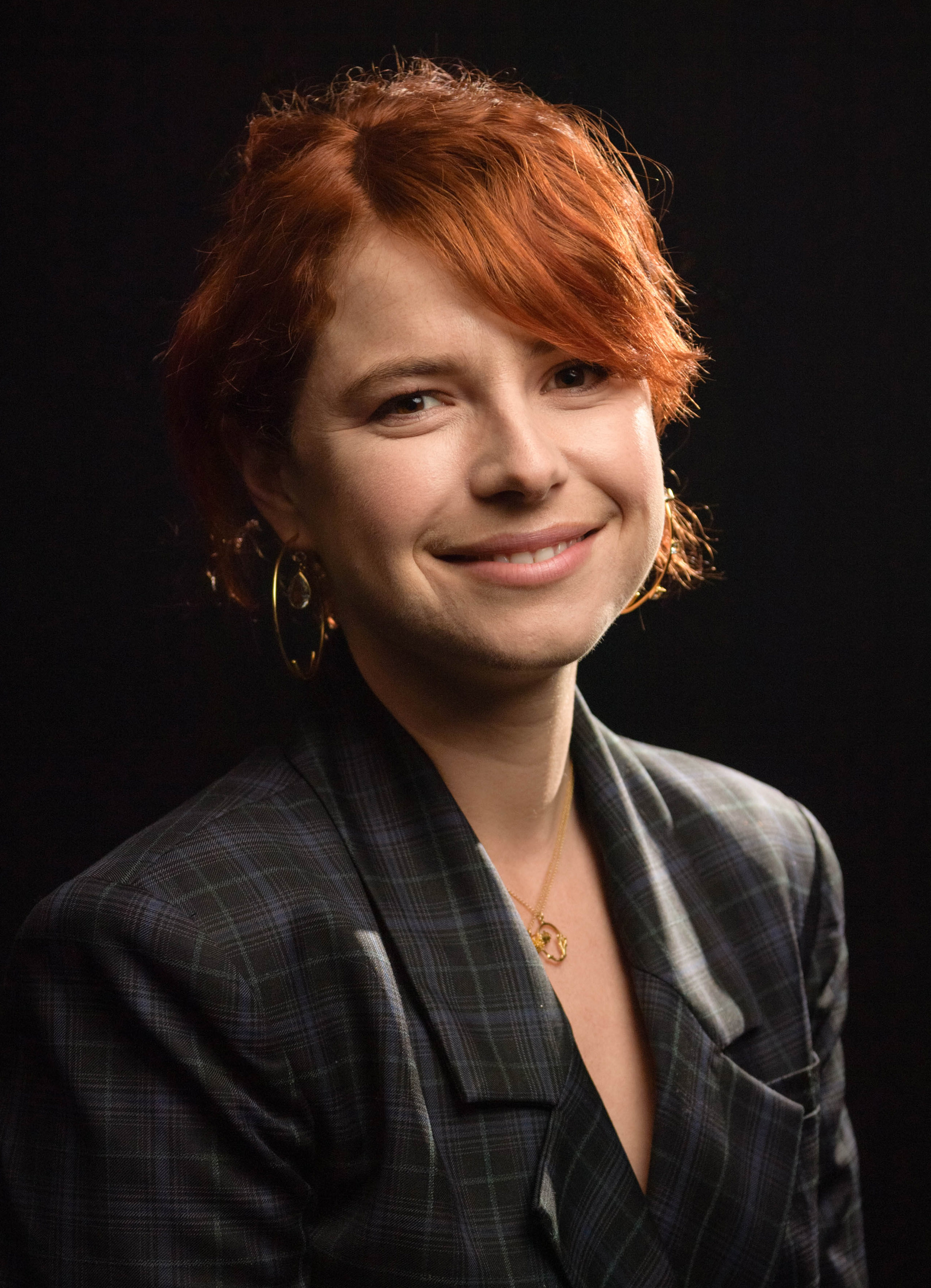
The 2025 recipient: Jessie Buckley

The Washington D.C. Area Film Critics Association Award for Best Actress is one of the annual awards given by the Washington D.C. Area Film Critics Association.

== Winners and nominees ==
=== 2000s ===
Year	Actress	Film	Role
2002	Julianne Moore	Far from Heaven	Cathy Whitaker
2002	Maggie Gyllenhaal	Secretary	Lee Holloway
2003	Naomi Watts	21 Grams	Cristina Peck
2003	Cate Blanchett	Veronica Guerin	Veronica Guerin
2003	Keisha Castle-Hughes	Whale Rider	Paikea Apirana
2003	Diane Keaton	Something's Gotta Give	Erica Barry
2003	Evan Rachel Wood	Thirteen	Tracy Louise Freeland
2004	Imelda Staunton	Vera Drake	Vera Drake
2005	Reese Witherspoon	Walk the Line	June Carter Cash
2005	Joan Allen	The Upside of Anger	Terry Wolfmeyer
2005	Felicity Huffman	Transamerica	Sabrina "Bree" Osbourne
2005	Keira Knightley	Pride & Prejudice	Elizabeth Bennet
2005	Charlize Theron	North Country	Josey Aimes
2006	Helen Mirren	The Queen	Elizabeth II
2007	Julie Christie	Away from Her	Fiona Anderson
2008	Meryl Streep	Doubt	Sister Aloysius Beauvier
2009	Carey Mulligan	An Education	Jenny Mellor
2009	Sandra Bullock	The Blind Side	Leigh Anne Tuohy
2009	Maya Rudolph	Away We Go	Verona De Tessant
2009	Gabourey Sidibe	Precious	Claireece "Precious" Jones
2009	Meryl Streep	Julie & Julia	Julia Child

=== 2010s ===
Year	Actress	Film	Role
2010	Jennifer Lawrence	Winter's Bone	Ree Dolly
2010	Annette Bening	The Kids Are All Right	Dr. Nicole "Nic" Allgood
2010	Anne Hathaway	Love & Other Drugs	Maggie Murdock
2010	Nicole Kidman	Rabbit Hole	Becca Corbett
2010	Natalie Portman	Black Swan	Nina Sayers
2011	Michelle Williams	My Week with Marilyn	Marilyn Monroe
2011	Viola Davis	The Help	Aibileen Clark
2011	Elizabeth Olsen	Martha Marcy May Marlene	Martha
2011	Meryl Streep	The Iron Lady	Margaret Thatcher
2011	Tilda Swinton	We Need to Talk About Kevin	Eva Khatchadourian
2012	Jessica Chastain	Zero Dark Thirty	Maya
2012	Marion Cotillard	Rust and Bone	Stéphanie
2012	Jennifer Lawrence	Silver Linings Playbook	Tiffany Maxwell
2012	Helen Mirren	Hitchcock	Alma Reville
2012	Emmanuelle Riva	Amour	Anne Laurent
2013	Cate Blanchett	Blue Jasmine	Jeanette "Jasmine" Francis
2013	Sandra Bullock	Gravity	Dr. Ryan Stone
2013	Meryl Streep	August: Osage County	Violet Weston
2013	Judi Dench	Philomena	Philomena Lee
2013	Emma Thompson	Saving Mr. Banks	P. L. Travers
2014	Julianne Moore	Still Alice	Dr. Alice Howland
2014	Scarlett Johansson	Under the Skin	The Female
2014	Felicity Jones	The Theory of Everything	Jane Hawking
2014	Rosamund Pike	Gone Girl	Amy Elliott-Dunne
2014	Reese Witherspoon	Wild	Cheryl Strayed
2015	Saoirse Ronan	Brooklyn	Eilis Lacey
2015	Cate Blanchett	Carol	Carol Aird
2015	Brie Larson	Room	Joy "Ma" Newsome
2015	Sarah Silverman	I Smile Back	Laney Brooks
2015	Charlize Theron	Mad Max: Fury Road	Imperator Furiosa
2016	Natalie Portman	Jackie	Jacqueline Kennedy Onassis
2016	Amy Adams	Arrival	Dr. Louise Banks
2016	Annette Bening	20th Century Women	Dorothea Fields
2016	Ruth Negga	Loving	Mildred Loving
2016	Emma Stone	La La Land	Mia Dolan
2017	Frances McDormand	Three Billboards Outside Ebbing, Missouri	Mildred Hayes
2017	Sally Hawkins	The Shape of Water	Elisa Esposito
2017	Meryl Streep	The Post	Katharine Graham
2017	Margot Robbie	I, Tonya	Tonya Harding
2017	Saoirse Ronan	Lady Bird	Christine "Lady Bird" McPherson
2018	Lady Gaga	A Star Is Born	Ally Maine
2018	Glenn Close	The Wife	Joan Castleman
2018	Toni Collette	Hereditary	Annie Graham
2018	Olivia Colman	The Favourite	Queen Anne
2018	Melissa McCarthy	Can You Ever Forgive Me?	Lee Israel
2019	Lupita Nyong'o	Us	Adelaide Wilson / Red
2019	Awkwafina	The Farewell	Billi Wang
2019	Scarlett Johansson	Marriage Story	Nicole Barber
2019	Saoirse Ronan	Little Women	Josephine "Jo" March
2019	Renée Zellweger	Judy	Judy Garland

=== 2020s ===
Year	Actress	Film	Role
2020	Frances McDormand	Nomadland	Fern
2020	Vanessa Kirby	Pieces of a Woman	Martha Weiss
2020	Viola Davis	Ma Rainey's Black Bottom	Ma Rainey
2020	Elisabeth Moss	The Invisible Man	Cecilia Kass
2020	Carey Mulligan	Promising Young Woman	Cassandra "Cassie" Thomas
2021	Kristen Stewart	Spencer	Princess Diana
2021	Olivia Colman	The Lost Daughter	Leda Caruso
2021	Lady Gaga	House of Gucci	Patrizia Reggiani
2021	Nicole Kidman	Being the Ricardos	Lucille Ball
2021	Tessa Thompson	Passing	Irene Redfield
2022	Cate Blanchett	Tár	Lydia Tár
2022	Viola Davis	The Woman King	General Nanisca
2022	Danielle Deadwyler	Till	Mamie Till
2022	Michelle Williams	The Fabelmans	Mitzi Fabelman
2022	Michelle Yeoh	Everything Everywhere All at Once	Evelyn Quan Wang
2023	Lily Gladstone	Killers of the Flower Moon	Mollie Kyle
2023	Aunjanue Ellis-Taylor	Origin	Isabel Wilkerson
2023	Greta Lee	Past Lives	Nora Moon
2023	Margot Robbie	Barbie	Barbie
2023	Emma Stone	Poor Things	Bella Baxter
2024	Mikey Madison	Anora	Anora "Ani" Mikheeva
2024	Cynthia Erivo	Wicked	Elphaba Thropp
2024	Karla Sofía Gascón	Emilia Pérez	Emilia Pérez / Juan "Manitas" Del Monte
2024	Marianne Jean-Baptiste	Hard Truths	Pansy Deacon
2024	Demi Moore	The Substance	Elisabeth Sparkle
2025	Jessie Buckley	Hamnet	Agnes Shakespeare
2025	Rose Byrne	If I Had Legs I'd Kick You	Linda
2025	Cynthia Erivo	Wicked: For Good	Elphaba Thropp
2025	Chase Infiniti	One Battle After Another	Willa Ferguson
2025	Renate Reinsve	Sentimental Value	Nora Borg
