= Julie Christie =

British actress (born 1940)

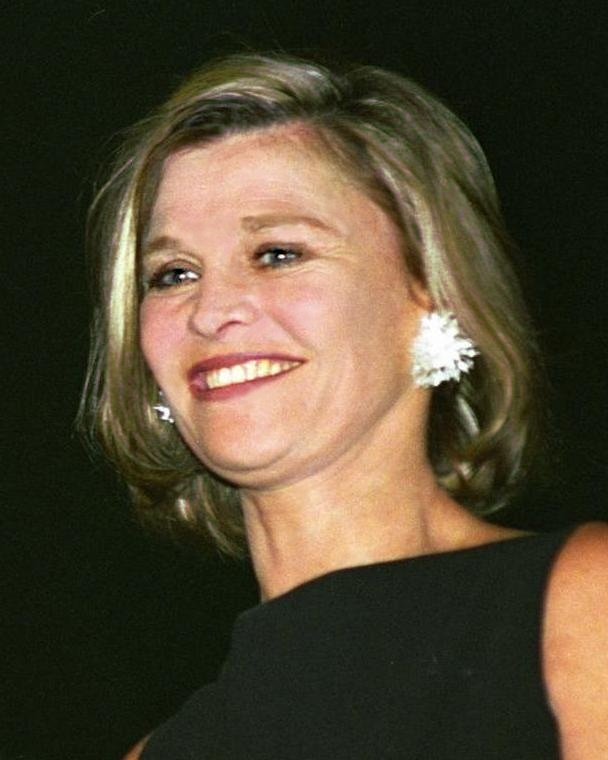
- Christie in 1997
- Born: Julie Frances Christie; 14 April 1940 (age 86); Chabua, Assam, British India
- Education: Central School of Speech and Drama
- Occupation: Actress
- Years active: 1957–present
- Spouse: Duncan Campbell (m. 2005; died 2025)

Julie Frances Christie (born 14 April 1940) is a British actress. She rose to stardom as a cultural symbol during the Swinging Sixties and became an icon of British Cinema. Christie's accolades include an Academy Award, a BAFTA Award, a Golden Globe, and a Screen Actors Guild Award. She has acted in six films ranked in the British Film Institute's Top 100 British Films of the 20th Century and received the BAFTA Fellowship in 1997.

Christie's breakthrough role on the big screen was in Billy Liar (1963). She won the Academy Award and the BAFTA Award for Best Actress for playing a flirtatious model in Darling (1965). She was further Oscar-nominated for McCabe & Mrs. Miller (1971), Afterglow (1997) and Away from Her (2007). Christie also starred in Doctor Zhivago (1965), Fahrenheit 451 (1966), Far from the Madding Crowd (1967), Petulia (1968), The Go-Between (1971), Don't Look Now (1973), Shampoo (1975), and Heaven Can Wait (1978) with supporting roles in Hamlet (1996), Finding Neverland (2004), Glorious 39 (2009), and Red Riding Hood (2011).

On stage, she made her Broadway debut in the Anton Chekov revival of Uncle Vanya (1973).

== Early life and education ==
Christie was born on 14 April 1940 at Singlijan Tea Estate, Chabua, Assam, British India, to Rosemary (née Ramsden), a Welsh-born painter, and Frank St John Christie, who ran the tea plantation where she grew up. She has a younger brother, Clive, and an older (deceased) half-sister, June, from her father's relationship with an Indian tea picker on his plantation. At the age of six she was sent to live with a foster mother so she could attend a convent school in England. Her parents separated when Julie was a child, and after their divorce, she spent time with her mother in rural Wales.

She was baptised in the Church of England and was a boarder at the independent Convent of Our Lady school in St Leonards-on-Sea, East Sussex, after being expelled from another convent school for telling a risqué joke that reached a wider audience than she had anticipated. After being asked to leave the Convent of Our Lady as well, she attended the all-girls Wycombe Court School, High Wycombe, Buckinghamshire, during which time she lived with a foster mother from the age of six. At the Wycombe school, she played the Dauphin in a production of Shaw's Saint Joan. She went to Paris to finish schooling and learn French. She later returned to England and studied at the Central School of Speech and Drama in London.

== Career ==
=== 1957–1962: Early work ===
Christie made her professional stage debut in 1957, and her first screen roles were on British television. Her earliest role to gain attention was in BBC serial A for Andromeda (1961). She was a contender for the role of Honey Ryder in the first James Bond film, Dr. No, but producer Albert R. Broccoli reportedly thought her breasts were too small. Christie appeared in two comedies for Independent Artists: Crooks Anonymous and The Fast Lady (both 1962). The latter was financed by the Rank Organisation, and Filmink magazine argued Christie was "another in the long, long line of classy female stars given early career breaks by Rank, only for the studio to not know what to do with her."

=== 1963–1978: Film stardom ===
Her breakthrough role was as Liz, the friend and would-be lover of the eponymous character played by Tom Courtenay in Billy Liar (1963), for which she received a BAFTA Award nomination. The director, John Schlesinger cast Christie only after another actress, Topsy Jane, had dropped out of the film. It resulted in her being put under contract by Nat Cohen. Christie appeared as Daisy Battles in Young Cassidy (1965), a biopic of Irish playwright Seán O'Casey, co-directed by Jack Cardiff and (uncredited) John Ford.

Her role as an amoral model in Darling (also 1965) led to Christie becoming known internationally; it also inspired the singer Tony Christie to take his stage name from Christie. The film was directed by Schlesinger and co-starred Dirk Bogarde and Laurence Harvey. Christie was cast in the lead role only after Schlesinger insisted, the studio having wanted Shirley MacLaine. Christie received the Academy Award for Best Actress and the BAFTA Award for Best British Actress in a Leading Role for her performance.

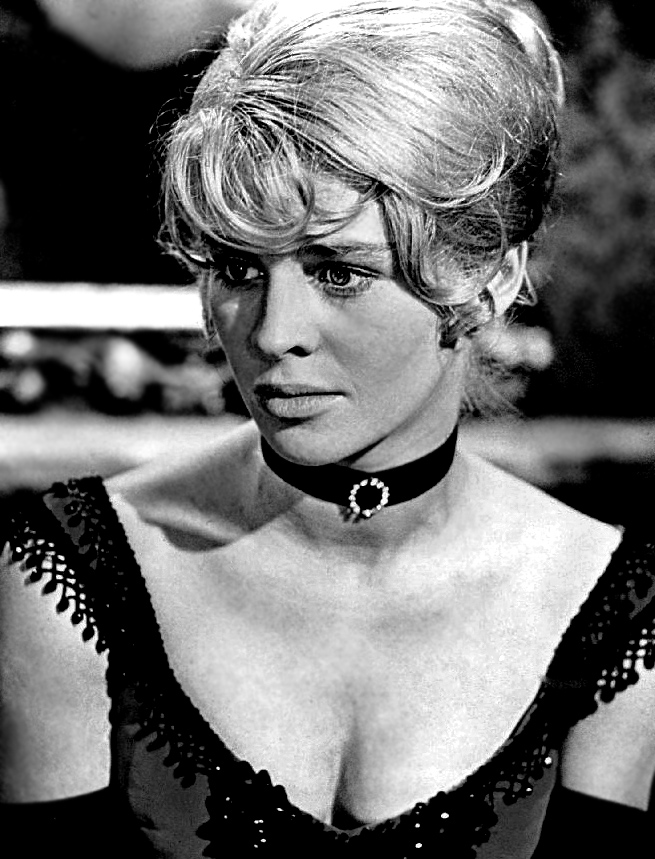
Christie in Doctor Zhivago (1965)

In David Lean's Doctor Zhivago (also 1965), adapted from the epic/romance novel by Boris Pasternak, Christie played Lara Antipova, in what has become her best-known role. The film was a major box-office success. As of 2019, Doctor Zhivago is the 8th highest-grossing film of all time, adjusted for inflation. According to Life magazine, 1965 was "The Year of Julie Christie".

After dual roles in François Truffaut's adaptation of Ray Bradbury's novel Fahrenheit 451 (1966), starring with Oskar Werner, she appeared as Thomas Hardy's heroine Bathsheba Everdene in Schlesinger's Far from the Madding Crowd (1967). After moving to Los Angeles in 1967 ("I was there because of a lot of American boyfriends"), she appeared in the title role of Richard Lester's Petulia (1968), co-starring with George C. Scott. Christie's persona as the Swinging Sixties British woman she had embodied in Billy Liar and Darling was further cemented by her appearance in the documentary Tonite Let's All Make Love in London. In 1967, Time magazine said of her: "What Julie Christie wears has more real impact on fashion than all the clothes of the ten best-dressed women combined".

In Joseph Losey's romantic drama The Go-Between (1971), Christie had a lead role along with Alan Bates. The film won the Grand Prix, then the main award at the Cannes Film Festival. She earned a second Best Actress Oscar nomination for her role as a brothel madam in Robert Altman's postmodern western McCabe & Mrs. Miller (also 1971). The film was the first of three collaborations between Christie and Warren Beatty, who described her as "the most beautiful and at the same time the most nervous person I had ever known". The couple had a high-profile but intermittent relationship between 1967 and 1974. After the relationship ended, they worked together again in the comedies Shampoo (1975) and Heaven Can Wait (1978).

Her other films during the decade were Nicolas Roeg's thriller Don't Look Now (1973), based on a story by Daphne du Maurier, in which she co-starred with Donald Sutherland, and the science-fiction/horror film Demon Seed (1977), based on the novel of the same name by Dean Koontz and directed by Donald Cammell. Don't Look Now in particular has received acclaim, with Christie nominated for the BAFTA Award for Best Actress in a Leading Role, and in 2017 a poll of 150 actors, directors, writers, producers and critics for Time Out magazine ranked it the greatest British film ever.

Christie returned to the United Kingdom in 1977, living on a farm in Wales. In 1979, she was a member of the jury at the 29th Berlin International Film Festival. Never a prolific actress, even at the height of her career, Christie turned down many high-profile film roles, including Anne of the Thousand Days, They Shoot Horses, Don't They?, Nicholas and Alexandra, and Reds, all of which earned Oscar nominations for the actresses who eventually played them.

=== 1980–2005: Mid-career, hiatus and resurgence ===
In the 1980s, Christie appeared in non-mainstream films such as The Return of the Soldier (1982) and Heat and Dust (1983). She had a major supporting role in Sidney Lumet's Power (1986) alongside Richard Gere and Gene Hackman, but apart from that, she avoided large budget films. She starred in the television film Dadah Is Death (1988), based on the Barlow and Chambers execution, as Barlow's mother Barbara, who desperately fought to save her son from being hanged for drug trafficking in Malaysia.

After a lengthy absence from the screen, Christie co-starred in the fantasy adventure film Dragonheart (1996), and appeared as Gertrude in Kenneth Branagh's Hamlet (also 1996). Her next critically acclaimed role was the unhappy wife in Alan Rudolph's domestic comedy-drama Afterglow (1997) with Nick Nolte, Jonny Lee Miller and Lara Flynn Boyle. Christie received a third Oscar nomination for her role. Appearing in six films that were ranked in the British Film Institute's 100 greatest British films of the 20th century, in recognition of her contribution to British cinema Christie received BAFTA's highest honour, the Fellowship, in 1997. In 1994, she had been awarded the title Doctor of Letters from the University of Warwick. Christie made a brief cameo appearance in the third Harry Potter film, Harry Potter and the Prisoner of Azkaban (2004), playing Madam Rosmerta. Around the same time, she also appeared in two other high-profile films: Wolfgang Petersen's Troy and Marc Forster's Finding Neverland (both 2004), playing mother to Brad Pitt and Kate Winslet, respectively. The latter performance earned Christie a BAFTA nomination as supporting actress in a film.

=== 2006–present: Comeback, later roles and retirement ===
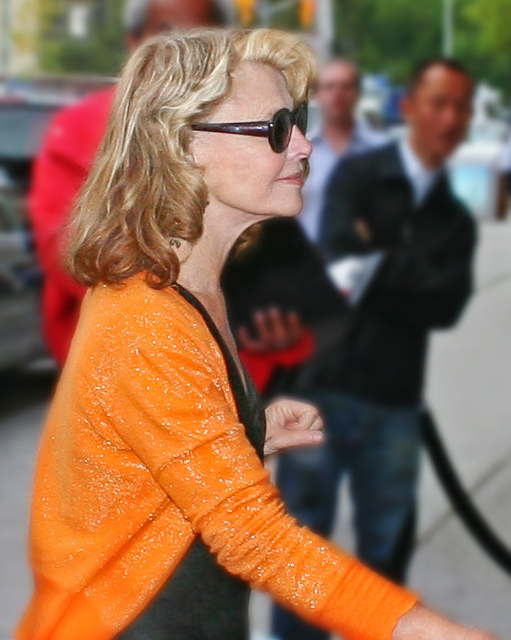
Christie at the 2006 Toronto International Film Festival

Christie portrayed the female lead in Away from Her (2006), a film about a long-married Canadian couple coping with the wife's Alzheimer's disease. Based on the Alice Munro short story "The Bear Came Over the Mountain", the movie was the first feature film directed by Christie's sometime co-star, Canadian actress Sarah Polley. She took the role, she said, only because Polley is her friend. Polley has said Christie liked the script but initially turned it down as she was ambivalent about acting. It took several months of persuasion by Polley before Christie finally accepted the role.

In July 2006 she was a member of the jury at the 28th Moscow International Film Festival. Debuting at the Toronto International Film Festival on 11 September 2006 as part of the TIFF's Gala showcase, Away from Her drew rave reviews from the trade press, including The Hollywood Reporter, and the four Toronto dailies. Critics singled out her performances as well as that of her co-star, Canadian actor Gordon Pinsent, and Polley's direction. Christie's performance generated Oscar buzz, leading the distributor, Lions Gate Entertainment, to buy the film at the festival to release the film in 2007 to build momentum during the awards season. On 5 December 2007, she won the Best Actress Award from the National Board of Review for her performance in Away from Her. She won the Golden Globe Award for Best Actress - Motion Picture Drama, the Screen Actors Guild Award for Outstanding Performance by a Female Actor in a Leading Role and the Genie Award for Best Actress for the same film. On 22 January 2008, Christie received her fourth Oscar nomination for Best Performance by an Actress in a Leading Role at the 80th Academy Awards. She appeared at the ceremony wearing a pin calling for the closure of the prison in Guantanamo Bay. Christie narrated Uncontacted Tribes (2008), a short film for the British-based charity Survival International, featuring previously unseen footage of remote and endangered peoples. She has been a long-standing supporter of the charity, and in February 2008, was named as its first 'Ambassador'. She appeared in a segment of the film, New York, I Love You (also 2008), written by Anthony Minghella, directed by Shekhar Kapur and co-starring Shia LaBeouf, as well as in Glorious 39 (2009), about a British family at the start of World War II. Christie played a "sexy, bohemian" version of the grandmother role in Catherine Hardwicke's gothic retelling of Red Riding Hood (2011). Her most recent role was in the political thriller The Company You Keep (2012), where she co-starred with Robert Redford and Sam Elliott.

== Style and reception ==
Pauline Kael, critic for The New Yorker, once said of Christie that she was the "girl one wanted to see on the screen not for her performances but because she was so great-looking that she was compelling on her own."

== Personal life ==
=== Marriage and relationships ===
Christie is fluent in French and Italian. In the early 1960s, Christie dated actor Terence Stamp. She had a live-in relationship with Don Bessant, a lithographer and art teacher, from December 1962 to May 1967, before dating actor Warren Beatty for seven on-and-off years (1967–1974). Christie was also linked romantically with musician Brian Eno, record producer Lou Adler, director Jim McBride and photographer Terry O'Neill.

Christie was married to journalist Duncan Campbell from 2005 until his death in 2025; they had lived together since 1979. In January 2008, several news outlets reported that the couple had quietly married in India two months earlier, in November 2007, which Christie called "nonsense", adding, "I have been married for a few years. Don't believe what you read in the papers."

=== Activism ===
Christie is active in various causes, including animal rights, environmental protection, and the anti-nuclear power movement. In the 1980s she was a supporter of the Greenham Common Women's Peace Camp. She is a patron of the Palestine Solidarity Campaign, as well as Reprieve, and the ME/CFS charity Action for ME. She is a vegetarian. She is a signatory of the Film Workers for Palestine boycott pledge that was published in September 2025.

=== Legal issues ===
In the late 1960s, her advisers adopted a very complex scheme in an attempt to reduce her tax liability, giving rise to the leading case of Black Nominees Ltd v Nicol (Inspector of Taxes). The case was heard by Judge Sydney Templeman (who later became Lord Templeman), who gave judgement in favour of the Inland Revenue, ruling that the scheme was ineffective.

== Acting credits ==
=== Films ===
Year	Title	Role(s)	Notes
1962	Crooks Anonymous	Babette LaVern	
1962	The Fast Lady	Claire Chingford	
1963	Billy Liar	Liz	
1965	Young Cassidy	Daisy Battles	
1965	Darling	Diana Scott	
1965	Doctor Zhivago	Lara Antipova	
1966	Fahrenheit 451	Clarisse / Linda Montag	
1967	Far from the Madding Crowd	Bathsheba Everdene	
1968	Petulia	Petulia Danner	
1969	In Search of Gregory	Catherine Morelli	
1971	The Go-Between	Marian Maudsley (Lady Trimingham)	
1971	McCabe & Mrs. Miller	Constance Miller	
1973	Don't Look Now	Laura Baxter	
1975	Shampoo	Jackie Shawn	
1975	Nashville	Herself	
1977	Demon Seed	Susan Harris	
1978	Heaven Can Wait	Betty Logan	
1981	Memoirs of a Survivor	"D"	
1982	The Return of the Soldier	Kitty Baldry	
1982	Les quarantièmes rugissants	Catherine Dantec	
1983	Heat and Dust	Anne	
1983	The Gold Diggers	Ruby	
1986	Champagne amer	Betty Rivière	
1986	Power	Ellen Freeman	
1986	Miss Mary	Mary Mulligan	
1990	Fools of Fortune	Mrs. Ellie Quinton	
1996	Dragonheart	Queen Aislinn	
1996	Hamlet	Gertrude	
1997	Afterglow	Phyllis Mann	
1999	The Miracle Maker	Rachael	voice
2001	Belphegor, Phantom of the Louvre	Glenda Spender	
2001	No Such Thing	Dr. Anna	
2002	I'm with Lucy	Dori	
2002	Snapshots	Narma	
2004	Troy	Thetis	
2004	Harry Potter and the Prisoner of Azkaban	Madam Rosmerta	
2004	Finding Neverland	Mrs. Emma du Maurier	
2005	The Secret Life of Words	Inge	
2006	Away from Her	Fiona Anderson	
2008	New York, I Love You	Isabelle	Segment: "Shekhar Kapur"
2009	Glorious 39	Elizabeth	
2011	Red Riding Hood	Grandmother	
2012	The Company You Keep	Mimi Lurie	
2017	The Bookshop	Narrator	
2024	Schneewittchen	The Queen	

=== Television ===
Year	Title	Role(s)	Notes
1961	Call Oxbridge 2000	Ann	Episode #1.3
1961	A for Andromeda	Christine / Andromeda	6 episodes
1962	The Andromeda Breakthrough	Andromeda	Episode: "Cold Front"; uncredited
1963	The Saint	Judith Northwade	Episode: "Judith"
1963	ITV Play of the Week	Betty Whitehead	Episode: "J. B. Priestley Season #3: Dangerous Corner"
1983	Separate Tables	Mrs. Betty Shankland and Miss Railton-Bell	TV movie from the two one-act plays by Terence Rattigan
1986	Sins of the Fathers	Charlotte Deutz	Miniseries
1988	Dadah Is Death	Barbara Barlow	TV movie
1992	The Railway Station Man	Helen Cuffe	TV movie
1996	Karaoke	Lady Ruth Balmer	2 Episodes: "Wednesday" / "Friday"

=== Theatre ===
Christie made her professional debut in 1957 at the Frinton Repertory Company in Essex.

Year	Show	Role	Playwright	Venue	Ref.
1964	The Comedy of Errors	Luciana	William Shakespeare	New York State Theatre, Lincoln Center	
1973	Uncle Vanya	Yelena	Anton Chekov	Chichester Festival Theatre, England	
1973	Uncle Vanya	Yelena	Anton Chekov	Circle in the Square Theater, Broadway	
1995	Old Times	Kate	Harold Pinter	Royal Court Theatre, West End	
1997	Suzanna Andler	Suzanna Andler	Marguerite Duras	Wyndham's Theatre, West End	
2007	Cries from the Heart	Performer	One-off Benefit Performance	Royal Court Theatre, West End	

== Awards and nominations ==
Major associations

Academy Awards

Year	Category	Nominated work	Result
1966	Best Actress	Darling	Won
1972	Best Actress	McCabe & Mrs. Miller	Nominated
1998	Best Actress	Afterglow	Nominated
2008	Best Actress	Away from Her	Nominated

British Academy Film Awards

Year	Category	Nominated work	Result
1964	Best British Actress	Billy Liar	Nominated
1966	Best British Actress	Darling	Won
1967	Best British Actress	Doctor Zhivago / Fahrenheit 451	Nominated
1972	Best Actress in a Leading Role	The Go-Between	Nominated
1974	Best Actress in a Leading Role	Don't Look Now	Nominated
1997	BAFTA Fellowship	—N/a	Honored
2005	Best Actress in a Supporting Role	Finding Neverland	Nominated
2008	Best Actress in a Leading Role	Away from Her	Nominated

Golden Globe Awards

Year	Category	Nominated work	Result
1966	Best Actress in a Motion Picture – Drama	Darling	Nominated
1976	Best Actress in a Motion Picture – Musical or Comedy	Shampoo	Nominated
2008	Best Actress in a Motion Picture – Drama	Away from Her	Won

Screen Actors Guild Awards

Year	Category	Nominated work	Result
2005	Outstanding Cast in a Motion Picture	Finding Neverland	Nominated
2008	Outstanding Female Actor in a Leading Role	Away from Her	Won

Miscellaneous awards

List of Julie Christie other awards and nominations
Award	Year	Category	Title	Result
AARP Movies for Grownups Awards	2007	Best Actress	Away from Her	Won
Alliance of Women Film Journalists Awards	2007	Best Actress	Away from Her	Won
Alliance of Women Film Journalists Awards	2007	Actress Defying Age and Ageism	Away from Her	Won
Alliance of Women Film Journalists Awards	2007	Bravest Performance	Away from Her	Won
Alliance of Women Film Journalists Awards	2007	Lifetime Achievement Award	—N/a	Honored
Boston Society of Film Critics Awards	2007	Best Actress	Away from Her	Runner-up
Chicago Film Critics Association Awards	2007	Best Actress	Away from Her	Nominated
Chlotrudis Awards	2008	Best Actress	Away from Her	Nominated
Critics' Choice Movie Awards	2007	Best Actress	Away from Her	Won
Dallas–Fort Worth Film Critics Association Awards	2007	Best Actress	Away from Her	Won
David di Donatello Awards	1967	Best Foreign Actress	Doctor Zhivago	Won
Detroit Film Critics Society Awards	2007	Best Actress	Away from Her	Nominated
Dublin Film Critics' Circle Awards	2007	Best Actress	Away from Her	Won
Evening Standard British Film Awards	1998	Best Actress	Afterglow	Won
Evening Standard British Film Awards	2007	Best Actress	Away from Her	Nominated
Evening Standard British Film Awards	2007	Special Award	—N/a	Honored
Fantasporto	1982	Best Actress	Memoirs of a Survivor	Won
Filmfest München	2008	CineMerit Award	—N/a	Honored
Genie Awards	2007	Best Performance by an Actress in a Leading Role	Away from Her	Won
Havana Film Festival	1986	Best Actress	Miss Mary	Won
Houston Film Critics Society Awards	2007	Best Actress	Away from Her	Won
Independent Spirit Awards	1997	Best Female Lead	Afterglow	Won
IndieWire Critics Poll	2007	Best Actress	Away from Her	3rd place
Iowa Film Critics Association Awards	2007	Best Actress	Away from Her	Won
Laurel Awards	1966	Best Dramatic Performance, Female	Darling	Won
Laurel Awards	1967	Female Star	—N/a	7th place
Laurel Awards	1968	Female Star	—N/a	5th place
London Film Critics' Circle Awards	2007	British Actress of the Year	Away from Her	Won
Moscow International Film Festival	1965	Diploma	Darling	Won
National Board of Review Awards	1965	Best Actress	Darling / Doctor Zhivago	Won
National Board of Review Awards	2007	Best Actress	Away from Her	Won
National Society of Film Critics Awards	1997	Best Actress	Afterglow	Won
National Society of Film Critics Awards	2007	Best Actress	Away from Her	Won
New York Film Critics Circle Awards	1965	Best Actress	Darling	Won
New York Film Critics Circle Awards	1997	Best Actress	Afterglow	Won
New York Film Critics Circle Awards	2007	Best Actress	Away from Her	Won
New York Film Critics Online Awards	2007	Best Actress	Away from Her	Won
Online Film Critics Society Awards	2007	Best Actress	Away from Her	Won
Phoenix Film Critics Society Awards	2007	Best Actress	Away from Her	Won
San Diego Film Critics Society Awards	2007	Best Actress	Away from Her	Won
San Francisco Bay Area Film Critics Circle Awards	2007	Best Actress	Away from Her	Won
San Sebastián International Film Festival	1997	Best Actress	Afterglow	Won
Satellite Awards	1997	Best Actress – Motion Picture Drama	Afterglow	Nominated
Satellite Awards	2007	Best Actress – Motion Picture Drama	Away from Her	Nominated
Saturn Awards	1977	Best Actress	Demon Seed	Nominated
Silver Goddesses Awards	1966	Best Foreign Actress	Darling	Won
Southeastern Film Critics Association Awards	2007	Best Actress	Away from Her	Won
St. Louis Film Critics Association Awards	2007	Best Actress	Away from Her	Nominated
Toronto Film Critics Association Awards	2007	Best Actress	Away from Her	Won
Vancouver Film Critics Circle Awards	2006	Best Actress in a Canadian Film	Away from Her	Nominated
Village Voice Film Poll	2007	Best Actress	Away from Her	2nd place
Washington D.C. Area Film Critics Association Awards	2007	Best Actress	Away from Her	Won

== See also ==
- List of British actors
- List of Academy Award winners and nominees from Great Britain
- List of oldest and youngest Academy Award winners and nominees — youngest winners for Best Actress in a Leading Role
- List of actors with Academy Award nominations
- List of actors with more than one Academy Award nomination in the acting categories
- List of Golden Globe winners
