= No Country for Old Men (novel) =

2005 novel by Cormac McCarthy

- First edition cover
- Author: Cormac McCarthy
- Language: English
- Publisher: Alfred A. Knopf
- Publication date: July 19, 2005
- Publication place: United States
- Media type: Print (hardback and paperback)
- Pages: 320 pp (hardback edition)
- ISBN: 0-375-40677-8 (Hardback edition)
- OCLC: 57352812
- Dewey Decimal: 813/.54 22
- LC Class: PS3563.C337 N6 2005

No Country for Old Men is a 2005 novel by American author Cormac McCarthy, who had originally written the story as a screenplay. The story occurs in the vicinity of the Mexico–United States border in 1980 and concerns an illegal drug deal gone wrong in the Texas desert back country. Owing to its origins as a screenplay, the novel has a simple writing style that differs from McCarthy's earlier novels. The book was adapted by the Coen brothers into a 2007 film of the same name, which won four Academy Awards, including Best Picture.

== Title ==
The title of the novel comes from the first line of the 1926 poem "Sailing to Byzantium" by W. B. Yeats.

== Plot ==
The plot follows the paths of the three characters set in motion by events related to a drug deal gone bad near the Mexican–American border in Terrell County in Texas.

Llewelyn Moss stumbles across the aftermath of a drug deal gone awry that has left all but one dead. That man, barely alive, asks for water. Moss responds that he does not have any, then while searching for other survivors, finds a body some distance off with a satchel containing $2.4 million in cash. He takes the money and returns home, but owing to his conscience, he returns to the scene with a jug of water. He finds another truck there. He tries to run, which sparks a chase through a valley. This is the beginning of a hunt for Moss that lasts for most of the novel. Moss sends his wife, Carla Jean, to her grandmother in El Paso, while he leaves his home with the money.

Sheriff Ed Tom Bell investigates the crime while trying to protect Moss and his wife, with the aid of other law enforcement agents. Bell is haunted by his actions in the Second World War, for which he received a Bronze Star. Bell has spent most of his life attempting to make up for an incident when he was a 21-year-old soldier. He makes it his quest to resolve the case and save Moss. Complicating things is the arrival of Anton Chigurh. Chigurh is a killer whose weapons of choice are a bolt gun and a pistol. Bounty hunter Carson Wells is also on the trail of the money. Moss, wounded in a firefight with Chigurh, recovers at a hospital while Chigurh patches himself up in a room with supplies taken from a drugstore. Moss is approached by Wells, who offers to give him protection in exchange for the satchel and tells him his location and number.

Chigurh finds Wells and murders him just as Moss calls to negotiate the exchange of money. Chigurh tells Moss that he will kill Carla Jean unless he hands over the satchel. Moss remains defiant and calls Carla Jean and tells her that he will meet up with her at a motel in El Paso. Carla Jean decides to inform Sheriff Bell about the meeting and its location. This call is traced and provides Moss's location to some of his hunters, who kill him but fail to find the money. Sheriff Bell goes to the hospital to identify Moss's body. Chigurh arrives at the scene and retrieves the satchel hidden in an air duct in Moss's room. He returns it to his client and later travels to Carla Jean's house. She pleads for her life and he offers her to flip a coin to decide her fate, but she refuses. Finally she chooses heads, and the coin turns out to be tails, and Chigurh kills her. After leaving the house, Chigurh is hit by a car that runs a red light at an intersection, leaving him badly injured. After asking for a shirt that one of two teenage boys was wearing who had witnessed the accident, he limps away from the scene of the accident.

Bell decides to retire and drives away from the courthouse feeling overmatched and defeated. He describes two dreams he experienced after his father died. The first is him meeting his father, who gives him some money, which Bell loses. The second consists of Bell riding his horse through a pass in the mountains on a cold winter's night. His father wordlessly passes him, carrying a horn lit with fire. Bell knew that his father would make a fire for him, and would be waiting for him when he arrived. He then woke up.

== Reception and legacy ==
William J. Cobb, in a review published in the Houston Chronicle (July 15, 2005), characterized McCarthy as "our greatest living writer" and describes the book as "a heated story that brands the reader's mind as if seared by a knife heated upon campfire flames". In the July 24, 2005, issue of The New York Times Book Review, the critic and fiction writer Walter Kirn suggests that the novel's plot is "sinister high hokum", but writes admiringly of the prose, describing the author as "a whiz with the joystick, a master-level gamer who changes screens and situations every few pages".

In contrast, literary critic Harold Bloom thought No Country for Old Men lacked the quality of McCarthy's best works, particularly Blood Meridian, and compared it to William Faulkner's A Fable. When comparing the lack of "moral argument" in Blood Meridian to the heightened morality present in No Country for Old Men, Bloom stated that the "apocalyptic moral judgments" made in No Country for Old Men represented "a sort of falling away on McCarthy's part". Furthermore, McCarthy received criticism for the presence of Mexican "drug-related" violence, while lacking the presence of a Mexican character.

No Country for Old Men: From Novel to Film is a collection of essays, edited by Lynnea Chapman King, Rick Wallach and Jim Welsh.

=== Film adaptation ===
In 2007, Joel and Ethan Coen adapted the book into a film of the same name, which was met with critical acclaim and box office success, winning various accolades from multiple organizations; it won four Academy Awards (including Best Picture), three BAFTAs, and two Golden Globes. No Country for Old Men was considered one of the best films of 2007, and many regard it as the Coen brothers' magnum opus. It has since been widely recognized as one of the greatest films of the 2000s and 21st century. (Note: Attributed to multiple sources.)
