= Toronto Film Critics Association Awards 2007 =

Annual Canadian film awards ceremony

11th TFCA Awards

December 18, 2007

Best Film:
No Country for Old Men

The 11th Toronto Film Critics Association Awards, honoring the best in film for 2007, were given on 18 December 2007.

== Winners ==
- Best Actor:
  - Viggo Mortensen – Eastern Promises

Runners-Up: George Clooney – Michael Clayton and Gordon Pinsent – Away from Her

- Best Actress (tie):
  - Julie Christie – Away from Her
  - Elliot Page (Note: Credited as Ellen Page) – Juno

Runner-Up: Laura Dern – Inland Empire

- Best Animated Film:
  - Ratatouille

Runners-Up: Paprika and The Simpsons Movie

- Best Canadian Film:
  - Away from Her

Runners-Up: Eastern Promises and Radiant City

- Best Director:
  - Joel and Ethan Coen – No Country for Old Men

Runners-Up: David Cronenberg – Eastern Promises and David Fincher – Zodiac

- Best Documentary Film:
  - No End in Sight

Runners-Up: Iraq in Fragments and My Kid Could Paint That

- Best Film:
  - No Country for Old Men

Runners-Up: Eastern Promises and Zodiac

- Best First Feature:
  - Away from Her

Runners-Up: Gone Baby Gone and Michael Clayton

- Best Foreign Language Film:
  - 4 Months, 3 Weeks and 2 Days • Romania

Runners-Up: The Diving Bell and the Butterfly • France and The Lives of Others • Germany

- Best Screenplay:
  - No Country for Old Men – Joel and Ethan Coen

Runners-Up: Juno – Diablo Cody and Michael Clayton – Tony Gilroy

- Best Supporting Actor:
  - Javier Bardem – No Country for Old Men

Runners-Up: Casey Affleck – The Assassination of Jesse James by the Coward Robert Ford and Philip Seymour Hoffman – Charlie Wilson's War

- Best Supporting Actress:
  - Cate Blanchett – I'm Not There

Runners-Up: Amy Ryan – Gone Baby Gone and Tilda Swinton – Michael Clayton
