= Washington D.C. Area Film Critics Association Awards 2007 =

Annual US film awards ceremony

6th WAFCA Awards
- Date: December 10, 2007

Highlights
- Best Film: No Country for Old Men
- Best Director: Joel Coen and Ethan Coen for No Country for Old Men
- Best Actor: George Clooney
- Best Actress: Julie Christie

The 6th Washington D.C. Area Film Critics Association Awards, honouring the best in filmmaking in 2007, were given on December 10, 2007.

== Winners ==
- Best Actor
  - George Clooney – Michael Clayton
- Best Actress
  - Julie Christie – Away from Her
- Best Animated Feature
  - Ratatouille
- Best Art Direction
  - Sweeney Todd: The Demon Barber of Fleet Street
- Best Breakthrough Performance
  - Elliot Page (Note: Credited as Ellen Page) – Juno
- Best Cast
  - No Country for Old Men
- Best Director
  - Joel Coen and Ethan Coen – No Country for Old Men
- Best Documentary Feature
  - Sicko
- Best Film
  - No Country for Old Men
- Best Foreign Language Film
  - Le scaphandre et le papillon (The Diving Bell and the Butterfly), France/United States
- Best Screenplay – Adapted
  - Charlie Wilson's War – Aaron Sorkin
- Best Screenplay – Original
  - Juno – Diablo Cody
- Best Supporting Actor
  - Javier Bardem – No Country for Old Men
- Best Supporting Actress
  - Amy Ryan – Gone Baby Gone and Before the Devil Knows You're Dead
