= Away from Her =

- Theatrical release poster
- Directed by: Sarah Polley
- Screenplay by: Sarah Polley
- Based on: "The Bear Came Over the Mountain" by Alice Munro
- Produced by: Daniel Iron; Simone Urdl; Jennifer Weiss
- Starring: Julie Christie; Gordon Pinsent; Olympia Dukakis; Michael Murphy; Kristen Thomson; Wendy Crewson
- Cinematography: Luc Montpellier
- Edited by: David Wharnsby
- Music by: Jonathan Goldsmith
- Production companies: Capri Releasing; Echo Lake Productions; Foundry Films; Hanway Films; The Film Farm
- Distributed by: Capri Releasing; Pulling Focus Pictures; Lionsgate Films (US)
- Release dates: September 11, 2006 (Toronto); May 4, 2007 (Canada)
- Running time: 110 minutes
- Country: Canada
- Language: English
- Box office: $9.1 million

Away from Her is a 2006 Canadian independent drama film written and directed by Sarah Polley and starring Julie Christie and Gordon Pinsent. Olympia Dukakis, Michael Murphy, Wendy Crewson, Alberta Watson, and Kristen Thomson are featured in supporting roles. The feature film directorial debut of Polley, it is based on Alice Munro's short story "The Bear Came Over the Mountain", from the 2001 collection Hateship, Friendship, Courtship, Loveship, Marriage.

The story centers on a couple whose marriage is tested when the wife begins to develop Alzheimer's and moves into a nursing home, where she loses virtually all memory of her husband and begins to develop a close relationship with another nursing home resident.

Away from Her premiered at the 2006 Toronto International Film Festival, Sundance Film Festival and the Berlin International Film Festival. It was theatrically released on May 4, 2007, and garnered critical acclaim, with critics praising Christie's performance and Polley's screenplay and direction. The film received two nominations at the 80th Academy Awards: Best Actress (for Christie) and Best Adapted Screenplay (for Polley). It also won seven Genie Awards, including Best Motion Picture.

== Plot ==
Grant and Fiona are a retired married couple living in rural Brant County, Ontario. Fiona begins to lose her memory, and it becomes apparent she has Alzheimer's disease. Throughout the film, Grant's reflections on his marriage are woven with his reflections on his own infidelities, and influence his eventual decisions regarding Fiona's happiness.

When she feels she is becoming a risk to herself, Fiona decides to check into a nursing home, where one of the rules is that a patient cannot have any visitors for the first 30 days, in order to "adjust". Despite being wary of this policy, Grant agrees at the insistence of his wife whom he loves. During the drive to the home, Fiona acknowledges Grant's past infidelity while he was a university professor. Despite the awkward situation, the couple makes love one last time before separating.

When the 30-day period ends, Grant goes to visit his wife again, only to find she has forgotten him, and turned her affections to Aubrey, a mute man in a wheelchair who has become her "coping partner" in the facility. A caregiver at the facility befriends Grant and gives him some advice and support.

While seeing his wife grow closer to Aubrey, Grant becomes an unhappy voyeur when visiting his wife at the nursing home. As time goes by and Fiona still does not remember him, Grant even wonders whether Fiona's dementia is an act, to punish him for his past indiscretions. After some time, Aubrey's wife Marian removes him from the home due to financial difficulties. This causes Fiona to sink into a deep depression, with her physical well-being also appearing to deteriorate. Grant is touched by this, and visits Marian in an effort to allow Fiona to see Aubrey again. He would rather see his wife happy with another man than miserable and alone. Marian initially refuses, but the meeting leads to a tentative relationship between her and Grant. As time passes, Grant continues to visit both Fiona and Marian. He eventually succeeds in taking Aubrey back to visit his wife. But in his "moment alone" before he brings Aubrey into Fiona's room, Fiona temporarily remembers him and the love she has for him. They embrace.

== Cast ==
- Julie Christie as Fiona
- Gordon Pinsent as Grant
- Olympia Dukakis as Marian
- Michael Murphy as Aubrey
- Kristen Thomson as Kristy
- Wendy Crewson as Madeleine
- Nina Dobrev as Monica
- Stacey LaBerge as Young Fiona
- Deanna Dezmari as Veronica
- Clare Coulter as Phoebe Hart
- Thomas Hauff as William Hart
- Alberta Watson as Dr. Fischer
- Grace Lynn Kung as Nurse Betty
- Melanie Merkosky as Singing Nurse
- Catherine Fitch as Receptionist
- Ron Hewat as Frank

== Production ==
=== Development ===
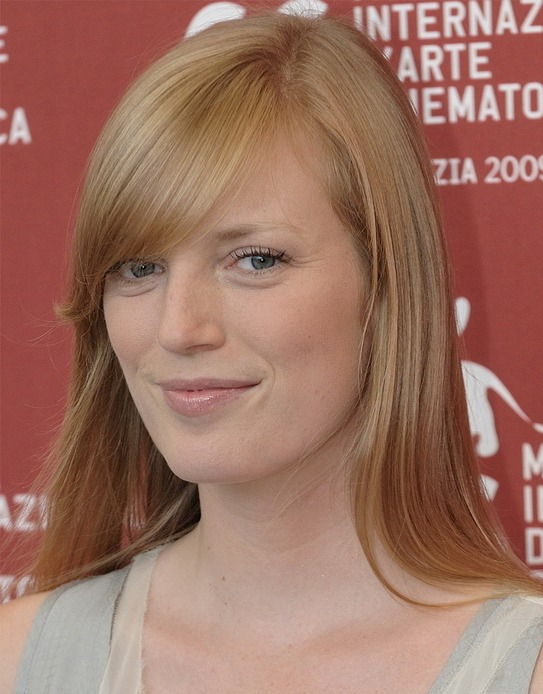
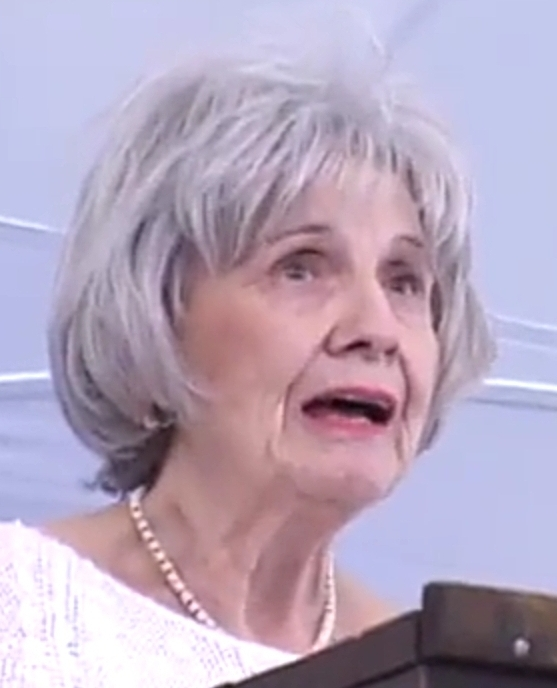
Director Sarah Polley adapted her screenplay from Alice Munro's story.

Sarah Polley read the short story "The Bear Came Over the Mountain" in The New Yorker when she was on a flight from working on Hal Hartley's No Such Thing in Iceland. Polley claimed to be impressed by Alice Munro's piece, saying "I found it so moving and poignant and it went so deep in me". She also envisioned her No Such Thing co-star Julie Christie as Fiona.

At that point of Polley's career, she had acted and had directed numerous short films, while the Munro adaptation would be her first feature film as director. Although Polley said Christie liked the story, it was still challenging to persuade Christie to star given her desire to semi-retire, and she was secured after seven months of negotiation.

Atom Egoyan, who directed Polley in films such as The Sweet Hereafter, served as executive producer. He advised her on directing, telling her "the actor is the only person who is doing something genuinely magical on set- and that has to be protected at all costs".

=== Filming ===
Principal photography was underway in Ontario in February 2006, scheduled to take place to April 7. Most of the shooting occurred in Kitchener, Ontario, with some filming in Brant, Bracebridge, Paris, Ontario and Toronto.

For the nursing home scenes, Grand River Hospital (Freeport Site) in Kitchener, Ontario was used. The actors and 60 crew members spent two weeks on an unused second floor.

== Release ==
The film premiered at the Toronto International Film Festival in September 2006. It was afterwards featured in the Sundance Film Festival and the Berlin International Film Festival.

In the United Kingdom, Away from Her opened on 27 April 2007. Distributed by Lions Gate Films, the film opened in New York City on 4 May 2007. Mongrel Media and Capri Releasing released the film in Canada on 4 May. The DVD release of the film included Polley's 2001 short film I Shout Love as a bonus feature.

== Reception ==
=== Box office ===
By 8 June 2007, Mongrel Media and Capri Releasing reported the film had grossed $1 million in Canada. It was the first English Canadian film to cross the $1 million threshold in Canada in 2007. It made an additional $2 million in the U.S.

The film finished its run on 19 July 2007 after grossing $4,571,521 in North America. It made $4,622,762 in other territories, for a worldwide total of $9,194,283.

=== Critical reception ===
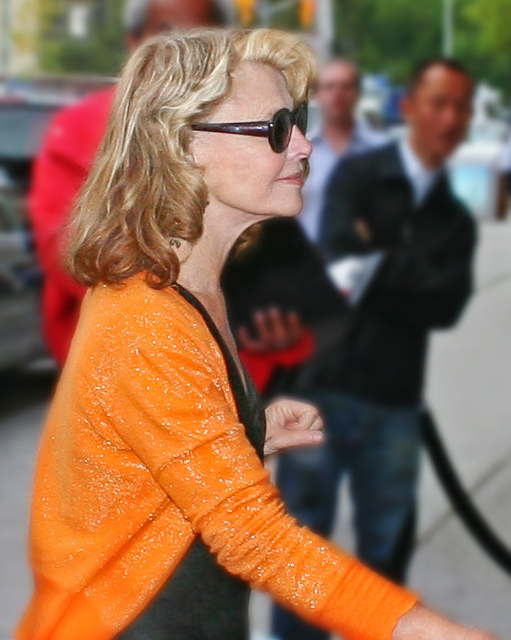
Julie Christie's performance received critical acclaim, earning a nomination for the Academy Award for Best Actress.

The film received acclaim from critics. As of October 21, 2020, the review aggregator Rotten Tomatoes reported that 94% of critics gave the film positive reviews, based on 145 reviews, and an average rating of 8.12/10. The website's critical consensus states, "An accomplished directorial debut by Sarah Polley, Away From Her is a touching exploration of the effects of Alzheimer's, in which the tender wisdom of Polley's script is beautifully complemented by a wonderful performance from Julie Christie". Metacritic reported the film had an average score of 88 out of 100 signifying 'universal acclaim' based on 36 reviews. In Canada, the Toronto International Film Festival named it one of Top 10 Canadian films of the year. The Globe and Mail called it "heartbreaking" and "indelible". Geoff Pevere gave it three stars in The Toronto Star, saying Christie gave a wonderful performance and Pinsent was even better.

Roger Ebert awarded it four stars, calling the greatest of the films about Alzheimer's of the early 21st century, and "a heartbreaking masterpiece". Peter Bradshaw, writing in The Guardian, found the film smart and said this is possibly Christie's greatest performance. Dave Calhoun of Time Out said the film stood out for the idea that Fiona's Alzheimer's is punishment for Gordon's adulteries.

Variety's Dennis Harvey complimented it for "a low-key, intelligent setting for performances marked by those same qualities", singling out Pinsent and Christie. Stella Papamichael, writing for BBC, gave it five stars, praising it as " a low-key yet powerful and uplifting story of love renewed", and said Christie's performance was memorable. Entertainment Weekly gave it a B, with Lisa Schwarzbaum writing Christie is "mesmerizing". The film appeared on many critics' top ten lists of the best films of 2007.

=== Accolades ===
Word about possible Academy Award recognition for Away from Her began at the Toronto International Film Festival, and critics associations particularly recognized Julie Christie for her performance. Lionsgate Films also chose to concentrate on promoting Christie in its Academy Award campaigning. It won many prizes at the 28th_Genie_Awards

Award	Date of ceremony	Category	Recipient(s)	Result	Ref(s)
Academy Awards	24 February 2008	Best Actress	Julie Christie	Nominated	
Academy Awards	24 February 2008	Best Adapted Screenplay	Sarah Polley	Nominated	
BAFTA Awards	10 February 2008	Best Actress	Julie Christie	Nominated	
Boston Society of Film Critics	11 December 2007	Best Actress	Julie Christie	Runner-up	
Broadcast Film Critics Association	7 January 2008	Best Actress	Julie Christie	Won	
Directors Guild of Canada	2007	Best Feature Film	Sarah Polley	Won	
Directors Guild of Canada	2007	Best Direction	Sarah Polley	Won	
Directors Guild of Canada	2007	Best Picture Editing	David Wharnsby	Won	
Directors Guild of Canada	2007	Best Production Design	Kathleen Climie	Nominated	
Directors Guild of Canada	2007	Best Sound Editing	Jane Tattersall, Barry Gilmore, Kathy Choi, David McCallum, Sue Conley and David Rose	Nominated	
Genie Awards	3 March 2008	Best Motion Picture	Daniel Iron, Simone Urdl and Jennifer Weiss	Won	
Genie Awards	3 March 2008	Best Direction	Sarah Polley	Won	
Genie Awards	3 March 2008	Best Actor	Gordon Pinsent	Won	
Genie Awards	3 March 2008	Best Actress	Julie Christie	Won	
Genie Awards	3 March 2008	Best Supporting Actress	Kristen Thomson	Won	
Genie Awards	3 March 2008	Best Adapted Screenplay	Sarah Polley	Won	
Genie Awards	3 March 2008	Best Editing	David Wharnsby	Nominated	
Genie Awards	3 March 2008	Claude Jutra Award	Sarah Polley	Won	
Golden Globe Awards	13 January 2008	Best Actress in a Motion Picture – Drama	Julie Christie	Won	
Los Angeles Film Critics Association	9 December 2007	New Generation Award	Sarah Polley	Won	
National Board of Review	15 January 2008	Best Actress	Julie Christie	Won	
National Board of Review	15 January 2008	Top Independent Films	Away From Her	Won	
National Society of Film Critics	5 January 2008	Best Actress	Julie Christie	Won	
New York Film Critics Circle	6 January 2008	Best Actress	Julie Christie	Won	
New York Film Critics Circle	6 January 2008	Best First Film	Sarah Polley	Won	
New York Film Critics Online	2007	Best Actress	Julie Christie	Won	
New York Film Critics Online	2007	Best Directorial Debut	Sarah Polley	Won	
Screen Actors Guild	27 January 2008	Outstanding Performance by a Female Actor in a Leading Role	Julie Christie	Won	
Toronto Film Critics Association	18 December 2007	Best Canadian Film	Away From Her	Won	
Toronto Film Critics Association	18 December 2007	Best Actor	Gordon Pinsent	Runner-up	
Toronto Film Critics Association	18 December 2007	Best Actress	Julie Christie	Won (Note: Tied with Elliot Page (Note: Then known as Ellen Page at the time of nomination.) for Juno.)	
Toronto Film Critics Association	18 December 2007	Best First Feature	Sarah Polley	Won	
Washington D.C. Area Film Critics Association	10 December 2007	Best Actress	Julie Christie	Won	
Writers Guild of Canada	April 2007	Best Feature Film	Sarah Polley	Won	

=== Criticism on the adaptation ===
- Agnès Berthin-Scaillet, A Reading of Away from Her, Sarah Polley's adaptation of Alice Munro's short story, The Bear Came Over the Mountain, in: Journal of the Short Story in English (JSSE)/Les cahiers de la nouvelle, ISSN 0294-0442, n° 55 (Autumn 2010).
- McGill, Robert, "No Nation but Adaptation: The Bear Came over the Mountain, Away from Her, and What It Means to Be Faithful", in: Canadian Literature/Littérature canadienne, 2008 Summer; 197: 98–111.

=== Other ===
- Demetrios Matheou, "Not Remembering to Forget", in: Sight and Sound, 2007 May; 17 (5): 12. (Interview)
- Danny Munso, "Away from Her", in: Creative Screenwriting, 2007 Mar–Apr; 14 (2): 30.
