= No Country for Old Men =

2007 film by Ethan and Joel Coen

- Theatrical release poster
- Directed by: Joel Coen; Ethan Coen
- Screenplay by: Joel Coen; Ethan Coen
- Based on: No Country for Old Men 2005 novel by Cormac McCarthy
- Produced by: Scott Rudin; Ethan Coen; Joel Coen
- Starring: Tommy Lee Jones; Javier Bardem; Josh Brolin; Kelly Macdonald; Woody Harrelson
- Cinematography: Roger Deakins
- Edited by: Roderick Jaynes (Note: Roderick Jaynes is the shared pseudonym used by the Coen brothers for their editing.)
- Music by: Carter Burwell
- Production companies: Miramax Films; Paramount Vantage; Scott Rudin Productions; Mike Zoss Productions
- Distributed by: Miramax Films (United States) (Note: Since the acquisition of Miramax by ViacomCBS (now known as Paramount Skydance) on April 3, 2020, Paramount Pictures owns the worldwide rights to the film.); Paramount Pictures (International)
- Release dates: May 19, 2007 (Cannes); November 9, 2007 (United States)
- Running time: 122 minutes
- Country: United States
- Languages: English; Spanish
- Budget: $25 million
- Box office: $171.6 million

No Country for Old Men is a 2007 American neo-Western crime thriller film written, directed, produced, and edited by Joel and Ethan Coen, based on Cormac McCarthy's 2005 novel. Starring Tommy Lee Jones, Javier Bardem, and Josh Brolin, the film is set in the desert landscape of 1980 West Texas, United States. The film revisits the themes of fate, conscience, and circumstance that the Coen brothers had explored in the films Blood Simple (1984), Raising Arizona (1987), and Fargo (1996). It follows three main characters: Llewelyn Moss (Brolin), a Vietnam War veteran and welder who stumbles upon a large sum of money in the desert, Anton Chigurh (Bardem), a hitman who is sent to recover the money, and Ed Tom Bell (Jones), a sheriff investigating the crime. The film also stars Kelly Macdonald as Moss's wife, Carla Jean, and Woody Harrelson as Carson Wells, a bounty hunter seeking Moss and the return of the money.

No Country for Old Men premiered in competition at the 2007 Cannes Film Festival on May 19. The film became a commercial success, grossing $171 million worldwide against a budget of $25 million. Critics praised the Coens' direction and screenplay and Bardem's performance, and the film was heavily awarded, winning four Academy Awards (including Best Picture), three BAFTAs, and two Golden Globes. The American Film Institute listed it as an AFI Movie of the Year, and the National Board of Review selected it as the best of 2007. To date, it is the last Western film to ever win the Academy Award for Best Picture (the others being Cimarron in 1931, Dances With Wolves in 1990, and Unforgiven in 1992).

No Country for Old Men was considered one of the best films of 2007, and many regard it as the Coen brothers' magnum opus. It has since been widely recognized as one of the greatest films of the 2000s and 21st century. (Note: Attributed to multiple sources.) The Guardian's John Patterson wrote: "the Coens' technical abilities, and their feel for a landscape-based Western classicism reminiscent of Anthony Mann and Sam Peckinpah, are matched by few living directors", and Peter Travers of Rolling Stone said that it is "a new career peak for the Coen brothers" and "as entertaining as hell". In 2024, the film was selected for preservation in the United States National Film Registry by the Library of Congress as being "culturally, historically, or aesthetically significant".

== Plot ==
In 1980, hitman Anton Chigurh is arrested in Texas. He escapes by strangling the sheriff's deputy to death and steals a car by killing the driver with a captive bolt pistol. Later, he spares the life of a gas station owner for correctly calling a coin toss.

Llewelyn Moss is hunting pronghorns in the desert. He comes across the aftermath of a drug deal gone wrong, finding several dead men, a wounded Mexican man begging for water, drugs in a truck, and a briefcase containing $2 million in cash. He takes the briefcase and returns home. Feeling guilty, he returns with water that night but finds the man dead. He looks up to the ridge and sees two armed men who pursue him in a truck. He escapes by diving into a river. After making his way back home, Moss sends his wife, Carla Jean, to stay with her mother.

Chigurh is hired to recover the missing money; meanwhile, Terrell County Sheriff Ed Tom Bell begins investigating the failed drug deal. Chigurh searches Moss's trailer home, using his bolt pistol to blow out the door lock. Moss takes a taxi to a motel in Del Rio, where he hides the briefcase in his room's air duct. When Moss returns to the motel after purchasing new boots, he sees the curtains in his room in a different position from when he left and rightly assumes he has been found. Following a tracking device hidden in the case, Chigurh goes to Moss's motel and kills three Mexican mobsters who were waiting for Moss in his room. Moss has rented a second room adjacent to his first room with access to the duct where the money is hidden. He retrieves the briefcase before Chigurh opens the duct.

Moving to a motel in the border town of Eagle Pass, Moss discovers the tracking device, but Chigurh has already found him. Their gunfight spills onto the streets, badly wounding both and killing a truck driver. Moss flees to Mexico, hiding the case along the Rio Grande. Chigurh cleans and stitches his wounds with stolen supplies. Carson Wells, a bounty hunter, visits a wounded Moss in a Mexican hospital and offers protection from Chigurh in exchange for the money, but Moss refuses. Wells locates the case but does not take it, and returns to his hotel where Chigurh ambushes him. The phone rings as Wells is bartering for his life. Chigurh fatally shoots him and takes the call from Moss, vowing to kill Carla Jean unless Moss gives up the money.

Moss retrieves the case from the Rio Grande and arranges to meet Carla Jean at a motel in El Paso, where he plans to give her the money and hide her from danger. Carla Jean's mother unknowingly reveals Moss's location to a group of Mexicans tailing them. Bell reaches the motel in El Paso, only to find that the Mexicans have killed Moss. Carla Jean arrives later and weeps when Bell somberly removes his hat.

That night, Bell returns to the crime scene and sees that the lock has been blown out. Chigurh appears to be on the other side of the door, holding his shotgun. Bell hesitantly enters and finds the room empty, and notices that the room's air duct has been opened.

Carla Jean returns from her mother's funeral to find Chigurh waiting in her bedroom. Chigurh says he must fulfill his vow, but offers a coin toss as a compromise. Carla Jean refuses to call it, saying that only he can be responsible for her fate. Chigurh checks the soles of his boots as he leaves the house. As he drives through the neighborhood, another car crashes into him, breaking his arm. He pays a passing boy for the shirt off his back to use as a sling, and limps away.

Bell visits a relative and former lawman, Ellis, and tells him he plans to retire because he feels overmatched by the recent violence. Ellis tells Bell that he cannot evade fate, and only vanity makes him think otherwise. Bell retires from the force. One morning, he shares two dreams with his wife. In the first, he lost some money his father had given him. In the other, as he rode on horseback through a snowy mountain pass, his father rode past him carrying fire in a horn, and he knew his father would prepare a campfire ahead for both of them.

== Cast ==
- Tommy Lee Jones as Ed Tom Bell
- Javier Bardem as Anton Chigurh
- Josh Brolin as Llewelyn Moss
- Woody Harrelson as Carson Wells
- Kelly Macdonald as Carla Jean Moss
- Garret Dillahunt as Wendell
- Tess Harper as Loretta Bell
- Barry Corbin as Ellis
- Stephen Root as Man Who Hires Wells
- Rodger Boyce as El Paso Sheriff
- Beth Grant as Carla Jean's Mother
- Ana Reeder as Poolside Woman
- Matt Geistler as Poolside Man
- Josh Blaylock and Caleb Jones as Boys on Bikes
- Gene Jones as Gas Station Proprietor
- Kathy Lamkin as Desert Aire Manager
- Margaret Bowman as Del Rio Motel Clerk
- Matthew Posey as Sporting Goods Clerk

The role of Llewelyn Moss was originally offered to Heath Ledger, but he turned it down to spend time with his newborn daughter Matilda. Garret Dillahunt was also in the running for the role of Llewelyn Moss, auditioning five times for the role, but instead was offered the part of Wendell, Ed Tom Bell's deputy. Josh Brolin, who was not the Coens' first choice, enlisted the help of Quentin Tarantino and Robert Rodriguez to make an audition reel during the production of Grindhouse. His agent eventually secured a meeting with the Coens and he was given the part.

Javier Bardem nearly withdrew from the role of Anton Chigurh due to issues with scheduling. English actor Mark Strong was put on standby to take over, but the scheduling issues were resolved, and Bardem took on the role.

== Production ==
Producer Scott Rudin bought the film rights to McCarthy's novel and suggested an adaptation to the Coen brothers, who at the time were attempting to adapt the novel To the White Sea by James Dickey. By August 2005, the Coens agreed to write and direct the film, having identified with how it provided a sense of place and also how it played with genre conventions. Joel Coen said that the book's unconventional approach "was familiar, congenial to us; we're naturally attracted to subverting genre. We liked the fact that the bad guys never really meet the good guys, that McCarthy did not follow through on formula expectations." Ethan Coen explained that the "pitiless quality" was a "hallmark of the book, which has an unforgiving landscape and characters but is also about finding some kind of beauty without being sentimental." The adaptation was the second of McCarthy's work, following All the Pretty Horses in 2000.

=== Writing ===
The Coens' script was mostly faithful to the source material. On their writing process, Ethan said, "One of us types into the computer while the other holds the spine of the book open flat." Still, they pruned where necessary. A teenage runaway who appeared late in the book and some backstory related to Bell were both removed. Also changed from the original was Carla Jean Moss's reaction when finally faced with the imposing figure of Chigurh. As explained by Kelly Macdonald, "the ending of the book is different. She reacts more in the way I react. She kind of falls apart. In the film she's been through so much and she can't lose any more. It's just she's got this quiet acceptance of it." In the book, some attention is paid to the daughter, Deborah, whom the Bells lost and who haunts the protagonist in his thoughts.

Richard Corliss of Time stated that "the Coen brothers have adapted literary works before. Miller's Crossing was a sly, unacknowledged blend of two Dashiell Hammett tales, Red Harvest and The Glass Key; and O Brother Where Art Thou? transferred the Odyssey to the American south in the 1930s. But No Country for Old Men is their first film taken, pretty straightforwardly, from a prime American novel."

The writing is also notable for its minimal use of dialogue. Josh Brolin discussed his initial nervousness with having so little dialogue to work with:

I mean it was a fear, for sure, because dialogue, that's what you kind of rest upon as an actor, you know? ... Drama and all the stuff is all dialogue motivated. You have to figure out different ways to convey ideas. You don't want to overcompensate because the fear is that you're going to be boring if nothing's going on. You start doing this and this and taking off your hat and putting it on again or some bullshit that doesn't need to be there. So yeah, I was a little afraid of that in the beginning.

Peter Travers of Rolling Stone praised the novel adaptation. "Not since Robert Altman merged with the short stories of Raymond Carver in Short Cuts have filmmakers and author fused with such devastating impact as the Coens and McCarthy. Good and evil are tackled with a rigorous fix on the complexity involved."

Director Joel Coen articulated his interest in the McCarthy novel. "There's something about it – there were echoes of it in No Country for Old Men that were quite interesting for us", he said, "because it was the idea of the physical work that somebody does that helps reveal who they are and is part of the fiber of the story. Because you only saw this person in this movie making things and doing things in order to survive and to make this journey, and the fact that you were thrown back on that, as opposed to any dialogue, was interesting to us."

Joel stated that this is the brothers' "first adaptation". He further explained why they chose the novel: "Why not start with Cormac? Why not start with the best?" He further described this McCarthy book in particular as "unlike his other novels ... it is much pulpier." Joel stated that they have not changed much in the adaptation. "It really is just compression," he said. "We didn't create new situations." He further assured that he and Ethan had never met McCarthy when they were writing the script, but first met him during the shooting of the film. Joel believed that the author liked the film, while Ethan said, "he didn't yell at us. We were actually sitting in a movie theater/screening room with him when he saw it ... and I heard him chuckle a couple of times, so I took that as a seal of approval, I don't know, maybe presumptuously."

==== Title ====
The title is taken from the opening line of the 20th-century Irish poet William Butler Yeats' poem "Sailing to Byzantium":

That is no country for old men. The young
In one another's arms, birds in the trees
– Those dying generations – at their song,
The salmon-falls, the mackerel-crowded seas,
Fish, flesh, or fowl, commend all summer long
Whatever is begotten, born, and dies.
Caught in that sensual music all neglect
Monuments of unageing intellect.

Richard Gillmore relates the Yeats poem to the Coens' film, saying:

The lament that can be heard in these lines is for no longer belonging to the country of the young. It is also a lament for the way the young neglect the wisdom of the past and, presumably, of the old ... Yeats chooses Byzantium because it was a great early Christian city in which Plato's Academy, for a time, was still allowed to function. The historical period of Byzantium was a time of culmination that was also a time of transition. In his book of mystical writings, A Vision, Yeats says, "I think that in early Byzantium, maybe never before or since in recorded history, religious, aesthetic, and practical life were one, that architect and artificers ... spoke to the multitude and the few alike." The idea of a balance and a coherence in a society's religious, aesthetic, and practical life is Yeats's ideal ... It is an ideal rarely realized in this world and maybe not even in ancient Byzantium. Certainly within the context of the movie No Country for Old Men, one has the sense, especially from Bell as the chronicler of the times, that things are out of alignment, that balance and harmony are gone from the land and from the people.

==== Differences from the novel ====
Craig Kennedy adds that "one key difference is that of focus. The novel belongs to Sheriff Bell. Each chapter begins with Bell's narration, which dovetails and counterpoints the action of the main story. Though the film opens with Bell speaking, much of what he says in the book is condensed and it turns up in other forms. Also, Bell has an entire backstory in the book that doesn't make it into the film. The result is a movie that is more simplified thematically, but one that gives more of the characters an opportunity to shine."

Jay Ellis elaborates on Chigurh's encounter with the man behind the counter at the gas station. "Where McCarthy gives us Chigurh's question as, 'What's the most you ever saw lost on a coin toss?', he says, 'the film elides the word 'saw', but the Coens of course tend to the visual. Where the book describes the setting as 'almost dark', the film clearly depicts high noon: no shadows are notable in the establishing shot of the gas station, and the sunlight is bright even if behind cloud cover. The light through two windows and a door comes evenly through three walls in the interior shots. But this difference increases our sense of the man's desperation later, when he claims he needs to close and he closes at 'near dark'; it is darker, as it were, in the cave of this man's ignorance than it is outside in the bright light of truth."

=== Filming ===
The project was a co-production between Miramax Films and Paramount's classics-based division in a 50/50 partnership, and production was scheduled for May 2006 in New Mexico and Texas. With a total budget of $25 million (at least half spent in New Mexico), production was slated for the New Mexico cities of Santa Fe, Albuquerque, and Las Vegas (which doubled as the border towns of Eagle Pass and Del Rio, Texas), with other scenes shot around the West Texas towns of Sanderson and Marfa.

Coincidentally, Paul Thomas Anderson's film There Will Be Blood – another partnership between Miramax and Paramount which competed with No Country For Old Men at the Academy Awards – was being shot in Marfa simultaneously. The Coen brothers were actually forced to scrap an entire day of filming for No Country For Old Men when preparations for the oil derrick scene in There Will Be Blood nearby produced enough smoke to ruin all potential scenes.

Eddie Moore reported that the U.S.-Mexico border crossing bridge was actually a freeway overpass in Las Vegas, New Mexico, with a border checkpoint set built at the intersection of Interstate 25 and New Mexico State Road 65, however those two roads do not intersect. The Mexican town square scene was filmed in Piedras Negras, Coahuila.

In advance of shooting, cinematographer Roger Deakins saw that "the big challenge" of his ninth collaboration with the Coen brothers was "making it very realistic, to match the story ... I'm imagining doing it very edgy and dark, and quite sparse. Not so stylized."

"Everything's storyboarded before we start shooting," Deakins said in Entertainment Weekly. "In No Country, there's maybe only a dozen shots that are not in the final film. It's that order of planning. And we only shot 250,000 feet, whereas most productions of that size might shoot 700,000 or a million feet of film. It's quite precise, the way they approach everything. ... We never use a zoom," he said. "I don't even carry a zoom lens with me, unless it's for something very specific." The famous coin-tossing scene between Chigurh and the old gas station clerk is a good example; the camera tracks in so slowly that the audience isn't even aware of the move. "When the camera itself moves forward, the audience is moving, too. You're actually getting closer to somebody or something. It has, to me, a much more powerful effect, because it's a three-dimensional move. A zoom is more like a focusing of attention. You're just standing in the same place and concentrating on one smaller element in the frame. Emotionally, that's a very different effect."

In a later interview, he mentioned the "awkward dilemma [that] No Country certainly contains scenes of some very realistically staged fictional violence, but ... without this violent depiction of evil there would not be the emotional 'pay off' at the end of the film when Ed Tom bemoans the fact that God has not entered his life."

=== Directing ===
In an interview with The Guardian, Ethan said, "Hard men in the south-west shooting each other – that's definitely Sam Peckinpah's thing. We were aware of those similarities, certainly." They discuss choreographing and directing the film's violent scenes in the Sydney Morning Herald: "'That stuff is such fun to do', the brothers chime in at the mention of their penchant for blood-letting. 'Even Javier would come in by the end of the movie, rub his hands together and say, 'OK, who am I killing today?' adds Joel. 'It's fun to figure out', says Ethan. 'It's fun working out how to choreograph it, how to shoot it, how to engage audiences watching it.'"

Director Joel Coen described the process of film making: "I can almost set my watch by how I'm going to feel at different stages of the process. It's always identical, whether the movie ends up working or not. I think when you watch the dailies, the film that you shoot every day, you're very excited by it and very optimistic about how it's going to work. And when you see it the first time you put the film together, the roughest cut, is when you want to go home and open up your veins and get in a warm tub and just go away. And then it gradually, maybe, works its way back, somewhere toward that spot you were at before."

David Denby of The New Yorker criticized the way the Coens "disposed of" Llewelyn Moss. "The Coens, however faithful to the book", he said, "cannot be forgiven for disposing of Llewelyn so casually. After watching this foolhardy but physically gifted and decent guy escape so many traps, we have a great deal invested in him emotionally, and yet he's eliminated, off-camera, by some unknown Mexicans. He doesn't get the dignity of a death scene. The Coens have suppressed their natural jauntiness. They have become orderly, disciplined masters of chaos, but one still has the feeling that, out there on the road from nowhere to nowhere, they are rooting for it rather than against it."

Josh Brolin discussed the Coens' directing style in an interview, saying that the brothers "only really say what needs to be said. They don't sit there as directors and manipulate you and go into page after page to try to get you to a certain place. They may come in and say one word or two words, so that was nice to be around in order to feed the other thing. 'What should I do right now? I'll just watch Ethan go humming to himself and pacing. Maybe that's what I should do, too.'"

In an interview with Logan Hill of New York magazine, Brolin said, "We had a load of fun making it. Maybe it was because we both [Brolin and Javier Bardem] thought we'd be fired. With the Coens, there's zero compliments, really zero anything. No 'nice work.' Nothing. And then—I'm doing this scene with Woody Harrelson. Woody can't remember his lines, he stumbles his way through it, and then both Coens are like, 'Oh my God! Fantastic!'"

David Gritten of The Daily Telegraph wonders: "Are the Coens finally growing up?" He adds: "If [the film] feels pessimistic, Joel insists that's not the Coens' responsibility: 'I don't think the movie is more or less so than the novel. We tried to give it the same feeling.' The brothers do concede, however, that it's a dark piece of storytelling. 'It's refreshing for us to do different kinds of things,' says Ethan, 'and we'd just done a couple of comedies.'"

=== Musical score and sound ===
The Coens minimized the score used in the film, leaving large sections devoid of music. The concept was Ethan's, who persuaded a skeptical Joel to go with the idea. There is some music in the movie, scored by the Coens' longtime composer, Carter Burwell, but after finding that "most musical instruments didn't fit with the minimalist sound sculpture he had in mind ... he used singing bowls, standing metal bells traditionally employed in Buddhist meditation practice that produce a sustained tone when rubbed." The movie contains a "mere" 16 minutes of music, with several of those in the end credits. The music in the trailer was called "Diabolic Clockwork" by Two Steps from Hell. Sound editing and effects were provided by another longtime Coens collaborator, Skip Lievsay, who used a mixture of emphatic sounds (gun shots) and ambient noise (engine noise, prairie winds) in the mix. The foley for the captive bolt pistol used by Chigurh was created using a pneumatic nail gun.

Anthony Lane of The New Yorker states that "there is barely any music, sensual or otherwise, and Carter Burwell's score is little more than a fitful murmur", and Douglas McFarland states that "perhaps [the film's] salient formal characteristic is the absence, with one telling exception, of a musical soundtrack, creating a mood conducive to thoughtful and unornamented speculation in what is otherwise a fierce and destructive landscape." Jay Ellis, however, disagrees. "[McFarland] missed the extremely quiet but audible fade in a few tones from a keyboard beginning when Chigurh flips the coin for the gas station man", he said. "This ambient music (by long-time Coens collaborator Carter Burwell) grows imperceptibly in volume so that it is easily missed as an element of the mis-en-scene. But it is there, telling our unconscious that something different is occurring with the toss; this becomes certain when it ends as Chigurh uncovers the coin on the counter. The deepest danger has passed as soon as Chigurh finds (and Javier Bardem's acting confirms this) and reveals to the man that he has won." In order to achieve such a sound effect, Burwell "tuned the music's swelling hum to the 60-hertz frequency of a refrigerator."

Dennis Lim of The New York Times stressed that "there is virtually no music on the soundtrack of this tense, methodical thriller. Long passages are entirely wordless. In some of the most gripping sequences what you hear mostly is a suffocating silence." Skip Lievsay, the film's sound editor called this approach "quite a remarkable experiment," and added that "suspense thrillers in Hollywood are traditionally done almost entirely with music. The idea here was to remove the safety net that lets the audience feel like they know what's going to happen. I think it makes the movie much more suspenseful. You're not guided by the score and so you lose that comfort zone."

James Roman observes the effect of sound in the scene where Chigurh pulls in for gas at a Texaco station. "[The] scene evokes an eerie portrayal of innocence confronting evil," he says, "with the subtle images richly nuanced by sound. As the scene opens in a long shot, the screen is filled with the remote location of the rest stop with the sound of the Texaco sign mildly squeaking in a light breeze. The sound and image of a crinkled cashew wrapper tossed on the counter adds to the tension as the paper twists and turns. The intimacy and potential horror that it suggests is never elevated to a level of kitschy drama as the tension rises from the mere sense of quiet and doom that prevails."

Jeffrey Overstreet adds that "the scenes in which Chigurh stalks Moss are as suspenseful as anything the Coens have ever staged. And that has as much to do with what we hear as what we see. No Country for Old Men lacks a traditional soundtrack, but don't say it doesn't have music. The blip-blip-blip of a transponder becomes as frightening as the famous theme from Jaws. The sound of footsteps on the hardwood floors of a hotel hallway are as ominous as the drums of war. When the leather of a briefcase squeaks against the metal of a ventilation shaft, you'll cringe, and the distant echo of a telephone ringing in a hotel lobby will jangle your nerves."

== Style ==
While No Country for Old Men is a "doggedly faithful" adaptation of McCarthy's 2005 novel and its themes, the film also revisits themes the Coens had explored in their earlier movies Blood Simple and Fargo. The three films share common themes, such as pessimism and nihilism. The novel's motifs of chance, free-will, and predestination are familiar territory for the Coen brothers, who presented similar threads and tapestries of "fate [and] circumstance" in earlier works including Raising Arizona, which featured another hitman, albeit less serious in tone. Numerous critics cited the importance of chance to both the novel and the film, focusing on Chigurh's fate-deciding coin flipping, but noted that the nature of the film medium made it difficult to include the "self-reflective qualities of McCarthy's novel."

At the start of the film, Bell ruminates on a teenage criminal he arrested who was sentenced to death, and although the newspapers described the boy's murder of his 14-year-old girlfriend as a crime of passion, Bell muses that "he told me there wasn't any passion to it. Told me he'd been planning to kill someone for about as long as he could remember. Said if they turned him out, he'd do it again. Said he knew he was going to hell. Be there in about 15 minutes. I don't know what to make of that. I surely don't". Chicago Sun-Times critic Roger Ebert praised the narration: "These words sounded verbatim to me from No Country for Old Men, the novel by Cormac McCarthy ... But I find they are not quite. And their impact has been improved upon in the delivery. When I get the DVD of this film, I will listen to that stretch of narration several times; Jones delivers it with a vocal precision and contained emotion that is extraordinary, and it sets up the entire film."

In The Village Voice, Scott Foundas writes that "Like McCarthy, the Coens are markedly less interested in who (if anyone) gets away with the loot than in the primal forces that urge the characters forward ... In the end, everyone in No Country for Old Men is both hunter and hunted, members of some endangered species trying to forestall their extinction." Ebert writes that "the movie demonstrates how pitiful ordinary human feelings are in the face of implacable injustice."

New York Times critic A. O. Scott observes that Chigurh, Moss, and Bell each "occupy the screen one at a time, almost never appearing in the frame together, even as their fates become ever more intimately entwined."

Variety critic Todd McCarthy describes Chigurh's modus operandi: "Death walks hand in hand with Chigurh wherever he goes, unless he decides otherwise ... [I]f everything you've done in your life has led you to him, he may explain to his about-to-be victims, your time might just have come. 'You don't have to do this,' the innocent invariably insist to a man whose murderous code dictates otherwise. Occasionally, however, he will allow someone to decide his own fate by coin toss, notably in a tense early scene in an old filling station marbled with nervous humor."

Jim Emerson describes how the Coens introduced Chigurh in one of the first scenes when he strangles the deputy who arrested him: "A killer rises: Our first blurred sight of Chigurh's face ... As he moves forward, into focus, to make his first kill, we still don't get a good look at him because his head rises above the top of the frame. His victim, the deputy, never sees what's coming, and Chigurh, chillingly, doesn't even bother to look at his face while he garrotes him."

Critic Peter Bradshaw of The Guardian stated that "the savoury, serio-comic tang of the Coens' film-making style is recognisably present, as is their predilection for the weirdness of hotels and motels". But he added that they "have found something that has heightened and deepened their identity as film-makers: a real sense of seriousness, a sense that their offbeat Americana and gruesome and surreal comic contortions can really be more than the sum of their parts".

Geoff Andrew of Time Out London said that the Coens "find a cinematic equivalent to McCarthy's language: his narrative ellipses, play with point of view, and structural concerns such as the exploration of the similarities and differences between Moss, Chigurh and Bell. Certain virtuoso sequences feel near-abstract in their focus on objects, sounds, light, colour or camera angle rather than on human presence ... Notwithstanding much marvellous deadpan humour, this is one of their darkest efforts."

Arne De Boever believes that there is a "close affinity, and intimacy even, between the sheriff and Chigurh in No Country for Old Men [which is developed] in a number of scenes. There is, to begin with, the sheriff's voice at the beginning of the film, which accompanies the images of Chigurh's arrest. This initial weaving together of the figures of Chigurh and the sheriff is further developed later on in the film, when the sheriff visits Llewelyn Moss' trailer home in search for Moss and his wife, Carla Jean. Chigurh has visited the trailer only minutes before, and the Coen brothers have the sheriff sit down in the same exact spot where Chigurh had been sitting (which is almost the exact same spot where, the evening before, Moss joined his wife on the couch). Like Chigurh, the sheriff sees himself reflected in the dark glass of Moss' television, their mirror images perfectly overlapping if one were to superimpose these two shots. When the sheriff pours himself a glass of milk from the bottle that stands sweating on the living room table—a sign that the sheriff and his colleague, deputy Wendell (Garret Dillahunt), only just missed their man—this mirroring of images goes beyond the level of reflection, and Chigurh enters into the sheriff's constitution, thus further undermining any easy opposition of Chigurh and the sheriff, and instead exposing a certain affinity, intimacy, or similarity even between both."

=== Depicted violence ===
In an interview with Charlie Rose, co-director Joel Coen acknowledged that "there's a lot of violence in the book," and considered the violence depicted in the film as "very important to the story". He further added that "we couldn't conceive it, sort of soft pedaling that in the movie, and really doing a thing resembling the book ... it's about a character confronting a very arbitrary violent brutal world, and you have to see that."

Los Angeles Times critic Kenneth Turan commented on the violence depicted in the film: "The Coen brothers dropped the mask. They've put violence on screen before, lots of it, but not like this. Not anything like this. No Country for Old Men doesn't celebrate or smile at violence; it despairs of it." However, Turan explained that "no one should see No Country for Old Men underestimating the intensity of its violence. But it's also clear that the Coen brothers and McCarthy are not interested in violence for its own sake, but for what it says about the world we live in ... As the film begins, a confident deputy says I got it under control, and in moments he is dead. He didn't have anywhere near the mastery he imagined. And in this despairing vision, neither does anyone else." NPR critic Bob Mondello adds that "despite working with a plot about implacable malice, the Coen Brothers don't ever overdo. You could even say they know the value of understatement: At one point they garner chills simply by having a character check the soles of his boots as he steps from a doorway into the sunlight. By that time, blood has pooled often enough in No Country for Old Men that they don't have to show you what he's checking for." According to a study published by researchers at the Université libre de Bruxelles, Belgium, in 2014, Chigurh is the most clinically accurate portrayal of a psychopath to date.

Critic Stephanie Zacharek of Salon states that "this adaptation of Cormac McCarthy's novel touches on brutal themes, but never really gets its hands dirty. The movie's violence isn't pulpy and visceral, the kind of thing that hits like a fist; it's brutal, and rather relentless, but there are still several layers of comfortable distance between it and us. At one point a character lifts his cowboy boot, daintily, so it won't be mussed by the pool of blood gathering at his feet ... The Coens have often used cruel violence to make their points – that's nothing new – but putting that violence to work in the service of allegedly deep themes isn't the same as actually getting your hands dirty. No Country for Old Men feels less like a breathing, thinking movie than an exercise. That may be partly because it's an adaptation of a book by a contemporary author who's usually spoken of in hushed, respectful, hat-in-hand tones, as if he were a schoolmarm who'd finally brought some sense and order to a lawless town."

Ryan P. Doom explains how the violence devolves as the film progresses: "The savagery of American violence begins with Chigurh's introduction: a quick one-two punch of strangulation and a bloody cattle gun. The strangulation in particular demonstrates the level of the Coens' capability to create realistic carnage-to allow the audience to understand the horror that violence delivers. ... Chigurh kills a total of 12 (possibly more) people, and, curiously enough, the violence devolves as the film progresses. During the first half of the film, the Coens never shy from unleashing Chigurh ... The devolution of violence starts with Chigurh's shootout with Moss in the motel. Aside from the truck owner who is shot in the head after Moss flags him down, both the motel clerk and Wells's death occur offscreen. Wells's death in particular demonstrates that murder means nothing. Calm beyond comfort, the camera pans away when Chigurh shoots Wells with a silenced shotgun as the phone rings. He answers. It is Moss, and while they talk, blood oozes across the room toward Chigurh's feet. Not moving, he places his feet up on the bed and continues the conversation as the blood continues to spread across the floor. By the time he keeps his promise of visiting Carla Jean, the resolution and the violence appear incomplete. Though we're not shown Carla Jean's death, when Chigurh exits and checks the bottom of his socks [boots] for blood, it's a clear indication that his brand of violence has struck again."

=== Similarities to earlier Coen brothers films ===
Richard Gillmore states that "the previous Coen brothers movie that has the most in common with No Country for Old Men is, in fact, Fargo (1996). In Fargo there is an older, wiser police chief, Marge Gunderson (Frances McDormand) just as there is in No Country for Old Men. In both movies, a local police officer is confronted with grisly murders committed by men from out of town. In both movies, greed lies behind the plots. Both movies feature as a central character a cold-blooded killer who does not seem quite human and whom the police officer seeks to apprehend."

Joel Coen and David Gritten agree. In an interview with Gritten of The Daily Telegraph, Gritten states that "overall [the film] seems to belong in a rarefied category of Coen films occupied only by Fargo (1996), which ... is also a crime story with a decent small-town sheriff as its central character. Joel sighs. 'I know. There are parallels.' He shakes his head. 'These things really should seem obvious to us.'" In addition, Ethan Coen states that "we're not conscious of it, [and] to the extent that we are, we try to avoid it. The similarity to Fargo did occur to us, not that it was a good or a bad thing. That's the only thing that comes to mind as being reminiscent of our own movies, [and] it is by accident."

Richard Corliss of Time magazine adds that "there's also Tommy Lee Jones playing a cop as righteous as Marge in Fargo", while Paul Arendt of the BBC stated that the film transplants the "despairing nihilism and tar-black humour of Fargo to the arid plains of Blood Simple."

Some critics have also identified similarities between No Country for Old Men and the Coens' previous film Raising Arizona, namely the commonalities shared by Anton Chigurh and the fellow bounty hunter Leonard Smalls.

== Genre ==
"Crime western noir horror comedy"

— Critic Rob Mackie of The Guardian on the many genres he believes are reflected in the film.

Although Paul Arendt of the BBC finds that "No Country ... can be enjoyed as a straightforward genre thriller" with "suspense sequences ... that rival the best of Hitchcock", in other respects the film can be described as a western, and the question remains unsettled. For Richard Gillmore, it "is, and is not, a western. It takes place in the West and its main protagonists are what you might call westerners. On the other hand, the plot revolves around a drug deal that has gone bad; it involves four-wheel-drive vehicles, semiautomatic weapons, and executives in high-rise buildings, none of which would seem to belong in a western."

William J. Devlin finesses the point, calling the film a "neo-western", distinguishing it from the classic western by the way it "demonstrates a decline, or decay, of the traditional western ideal ... The moral framework of the West ... that contained ... innocent and wholesome heroes who fought for what is right, is fading. The villains, or the criminals, act in such a way that the traditional hero cannot make sense of their criminal behavior."

Deborah Biancott sees a "western gothic ..., a struggle for and with God, an examination of a humanity haunted by its past and condemned to the horrors of its future. ... [I]t's a tale of unrepentant evil, the frightening but compelling bad guy who lives by a moral code that is unrecognizable and alien. The wanderer, the psychopath, Anton Chigurh, is a man who's supernaturally invincible."

Even the directors have weighed in. Joel Coen found the film "interesting in a genre way; but it was also interesting to us because it subverts the genre expectations." He did not consider the film a western because "when we think about westerns we think about horses and six-guns, saloons and hitching posts." But co-director Ethan said that the film "is sort of a western," before adding "and sort of not."

Gillmore, though, thinks that it is "a mixing of the two great American movie genres, the western and film noir," which "reflect the two sides of the American psyche. On the one hand, there is a western in which the westerner is faced with overwhelming odds, but between his perseverance and his skill, he overcomes the odds and triumphs. ... In film noir, on the other hand, the hero is smart (more or less) and wily and there are many obstacles to overcome, the odds are against him, and, in fact, he fails to overcome them. ... This genre reflects the pessimism and fatalism of the American psyche. With No Country for Old Men, the Coens combine these two genres into one movie. It is a western with a tragic, existential, film noir ending."

== Themes and analysis ==
One of the themes in the story involves the tension between destiny and self-determination. According to Richard Gillmore, the main characters are torn between a sense of inevitability "that the world goes on its way and that it does not have much to do with human desires and concerns", and the notion that our futures are inextricably connected to our own past actions. Enda McCaffrey details a character who refuses to acknowledge his own agency, noting that Anton Chigurh (Javier Bardem) ignores repeated reminders that he doesn't have to behave as he does and suggesting that by relegating the lives of Carla and the gas station clerk to a coin toss, he hands "responsibility over to 'fate' in an act of bad faith that prevents him from taking responsibility for his own ethical choices".

Not only behavior, but position alters. One of the themes developed in the story is the shifting identity of hunter and hunted. Scott Foundas stresses that everyone in the film plays both roles, while Judie Newman focuses on the moments of transition, when hunter Llewelyn Moss and investigator Wells become themselves targets.

The story contrasts old narratives of the "Wild West" with modern crimes, suggesting that the heroes of old can at best hope to escape from rather than to triumph over evil. William J. Devlin explores the narrative of Sheriff Ed Tom Bell, an aging Western hero, symbolic of an older tradition, who does not serve an underpopulated "Wild West", but an evolved landscape with new breeds of crime which baffle him. William Luhr focuses on the perspective of the retiring lawman played by Tommy Lee Jones at the beginning of the film, who is withdrawing from an evil which he cannot understand or address, reflecting the film's millennial worldview with "no hope for a viable future, only the remote possibility of individual detachment from it all".

== Release ==
=== Theatrical release and box office ===
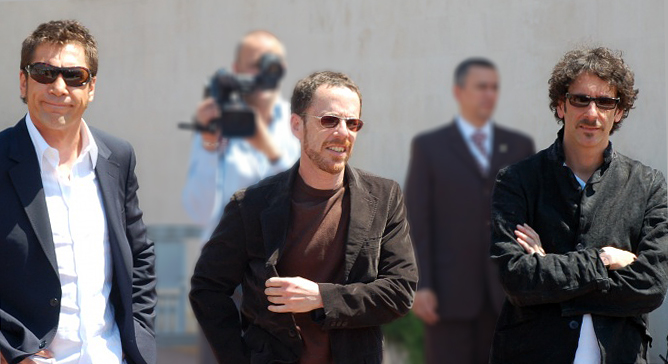
Javier Bardem (left) with the Coen brothers at the 2007 Cannes Film Festival

No Country for Old Men premiered in competition at the 2007 Cannes Film Festival on May 19. Stephen Robb of the BBC covered the film opening at Cannes. "With no sign yet of an undisputed classic in competition at this 60th Cannes," he said, "No Country for Old Men may have emerged as a frontrunner for the trophy Joel and Ethan Coen collected for Barton Fink in 1991. "We are very fortunate in that our films have sort of found a home here," says Joel. "From the point of view of getting the movies out to an audience, this has always been a very congenial platform."

The reception to the film's first press screening in Cannes was positive. Screen International's jury of critics, assembled for its daily Cannes publication, all gave the film three or four marks out of four. The magazine's review said the film fell short of "the greatness that sometimes seems within its grasp". But it added that the film was "guaranteed to attract a healthy audience on the basis of the track record of those involved, respect for the novel and critical support".

The film commercially opened in limited release in 28 theaters in the United States on November 9, 2007, grossing $1,226,333 over the opening weekend, and opened in the United Kingdom (limited release) and Ireland on January 18, 2008. The film expanded to a wide release in 860 theaters in the United States on November 21, 2007, grossing $7,776,773 over the first weekend. The film subsequently increased the number of theaters to 2,037. It was the 5th highest ranking film at the US box office in the weekend ending December 16, 2007. The film opened in Australia on December 26, 2007. As of February 13, 2009, the film had grossed $74,283,000 domestically (United States). No Country for Old Men became the biggest box-office hit for the Coens, until it was surpassed by True Grit in 2010.

No Country for Old Men is the third-lowest-grossing Oscar winner, only surpassing Crash (2005) and The Hurt Locker (2009). "The final balance sheet was a $74 million gross" domestically. Miramax employed its typical "gradual-release" strategy: it was "released in November, ... was initially given a limited release, ... and ... benefited from the nomination and the win, with weekend grosses picking up after each". By contrast, the previous year's winner, The Departed was a "Best Picture winner with the time series chart that is typical of Hollywood blockbusters – a big opening weekend followed by a steady decline".

=== Home media ===
Buena Vista Home Entertainment released the film on DVD and in the high definition Blu-ray format on March 11, 2008, in the United States. The only extras are three behind-the-scenes featurettes. The release topped the home video rental charts upon release and remained in the top 10 positions for the first 5 weeks.

Website Blu-ray.com reviewed the Blu-ray edition of the film, and gave the video quality an almost full mark. It stated that "with its AVC MPEG-4 video on BD-50, the picture quality of No Country for Old Men stands on the highest rung of the home video ladder. Color vibrancy, black level, resolution and contrast are reference quality ... Every line and wrinkle in Bell's face is resolved and Chigurh sports a pageboy haircut in which every strand of hair appears individually distinguishable. No other film brings its characters to life so vividly solely on the merits of visual technicalities ... Watch the nighttime shoot-out between Moss and Chigurh outside the hotel ... As bullets slam through the windshield of Moss's getaway car, watch as every crack and bullet hole in the glass is extraordinarily defined."

The audio quality earned an almost full mark, where the "24-bit 48 kHz lossless PCM serves voices well, and excels in more treble-prone sounds ... Perhaps the most audibly dynamic sequence is the dawn chase scene after Moss returns with water. Close your eyes and listen to Moss's breathing and footsteps as he runs, the truck in pursuit as it labors over rocks and shrubs, the crack of the rifle and hissing of bullets as they rip through the air and hit the ground ... the entire sequence and the film overall sounds very convincing."

Kenneth S. Brown of website High-Def Digest stated that "the Blu-ray edition of the film ... is magnificent ... and includes all of the 480i/p special features that appear on the standard DVD. However, to my disappointment, the slim supplemental package doesn't include a much needed directors' commentary from the Coens. It would have been fascinating to listen to the brothers dissect the differences between the original novel and the Oscar-winning film. It may not have a compelling supplemental package, but it does have a striking video transfer and an excellent PCM audio track."

The Region 2 DVD (Paramount) was released on June 2, 2008. The film was released on Blu-ray Disc in the United Kingdom on September 8, 2008. A 3-disc special edition with a digital copy was released on DVD and Blu-ray on April 7, 2009. It was presented in its theatrical 2.35:1 anamorphic widescreen aspect ratio and in Dolby Digital 5.1 (English, Spanish). This release included over five hours of new bonus features although it lacks deleted scenes and audio commentary. Some of the bonus material/features on the disc include documentaries about the production and working with the Coens, a featurette made by Brolin, the featurette "Diary of a Country Sheriff" which considers the lead characters and the subtext they form, a Q&A discussion with the crew hosted by Spike Jonze, and a variety of interviews with the cast and the Coens from EW.com Just a Minute, ABC Popcorn with Peter Travers, and an installment of Charlie Rose.

A Criterion Collection 4k/Blu-ray edition was released on December 10, 2024.

== Reception and legacy ==
=== Critical response ===
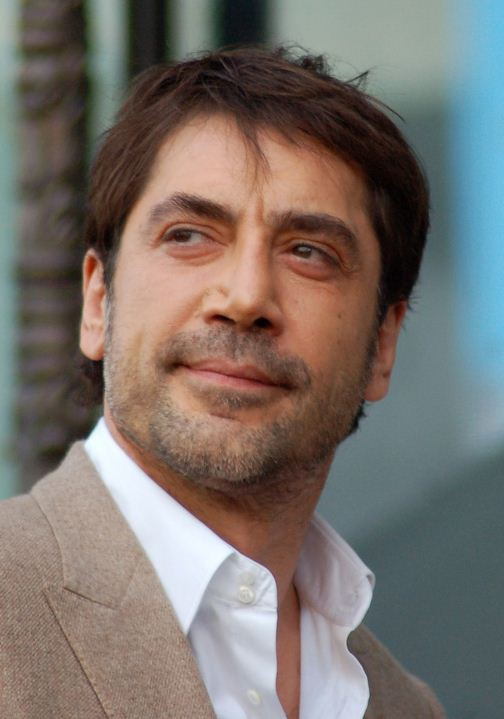
Javier Bardem's performance as Anton Chigurh received critical acclaim, earning him the Academy Award for Best Supporting Actor, thus becoming the first Spanish actor to win an Academy Award.

On the review aggregator Rotten Tomatoes, the film holds an approval rating of 93% based on reviews from 288 critics. The website's critical consensus reads, "Bolstered by powerful lead performances from Javier Bardem, Josh Brolin, and Tommy Lee Jones, No Country for Old Men finds the Coen brothers spinning cinematic gold out of Cormac McCarthy's grim, darkly funny novel." The film also holds a rating of 92 out of 100 on Metacritic, based on 39 reviews, indicating "universal acclaim". Upon release, the film was widely discussed as a possible candidate for several Oscars, before going on to receive eight nominations, and eventually winning four in 2008. Bardem in particular received considerable praise for his performance in the film.

Peter Bradshaw of The Guardian called it "the best of the [Coens'] career so far". Rob Mackie of The Guardian also said that "what makes this such a stand-out is hard to put your finger on – it just feels like an absorbing and tense two hours where everyone is absolutely on top of their job and a comfortable fit in their roles." Geoff Andrew of Time Out London expressed that "the film exerts a grip from start to end". Richard Corliss of Time magazine chose the film as the best of the year and said that "after two decades of being brilliant on the movie margins, the Coens are ready for their closeup, and maybe their Oscar". Paul Arendt of the BBC gave the film a full mark and said that it "doesn't require a defense: it is a magnificent return to form". A. O. Scott of The New York Times stated that "for formalists – those moviegoers sent into raptures by tight editing, nimble camera work and faultless sound design – it's pure heaven." Both Margaret Pomeranz and David Stratton from the ABC show At The Movies gave the film five stars, making No Country for Old Men the only film to receive such a rating from the hosts in 2007. Both praised the film for its visual language and suspense, David commenting that "Hitchcock wouldn't have done the suspense better".

In 2023, filmmaker Denis Villeneuve named it one of his favorite films of all time, calling it the Coen brothers' magnum opus.

Occasional disapproval was voiced, with some critics noting the absence of a "central character" and "climactic scene"; its "disappointing finish" and "dependen[ce] on an arbitrarily manipulated plot"; or a general lack of "soul" and sense of "hopelessness". Sukhdev Sandhu of The Daily Telegraph argued that "Chigurh never develops as a character ... with material as strong as this, one would think they could do better than impute to him a sprawling inscrutability, a mystery that is merely pathological." He further accused it of being full of "pseudo profundities in which [the Coen brothers] have always specialised." In The Washington Post, Stephen Hunter criticized Chigurh's weapons as unintentionally humorous and lamented, "It's all chase, which means that it offers almost zero in character development. Each of the figures is given, a la standard thriller operating procedure, a single moral or psychological attribute and then acts in accordance to that principle and nothing else, without doubts, contradictions or ambivalence."

=== Accolades ===
"We're very thankful to all of you out there for continuing to let us play in our corner of the sandbox."

— Co-director Joel Coen while accepting the award for Best Director at the 80th Academy Awards

No Country for Old Men was nominated for eight Academy Awards and won four, including Best Picture. Additionally, Javier Bardem won Best Supporting Actor; the Coen brothers won Achievement in Directing (Best Director) and Best Adapted Screenplay. Other nominations included Best Film Editing (the Coen brothers as Roderick Jaynes), Best Cinematography (Roger Deakins), Best Sound Editing and Best Sound Mixing.

Javier Bardem became the first Spanish actor to win an Oscar. "Thank you to the Coens for being crazy enough to think I could do that and put one of the most horrible hair cuts in history on my head," Bardem said in his acceptance speech at the 80th Academy Awards. He dedicated the award to Spain and to his mother, actress Pilar Bardem, who accompanied him to the ceremony.

While accepting the award for Best Director at the 80th Academy Awards, Joel Coen said that "Ethan and I have been making stories with movie cameras since we were kids", recalling a Super 8 film they made titled Henry Kissinger: Man on the Go. "Honestly," he said, "what we do now doesn't feel that much different from what we were doing then. We're very thankful to all of you out there for continuing to let us play in our corner of the sandbox." It was only the second time in Oscar history that two individuals shared the directing honor (Robert Wise and Jerome Robbins were the first, winning for 1961's West Side Story).

The film was nominated for four Golden Globe Awards, winning two at the 65th Golden Globe Awards. Javier Bardem won Best Performance by an Actor in a Supporting Role in a Motion Picture and the Coen brothers won Best Screenplay – Motion Picture. The film was also nominated for Best Motion Picture – Drama, and Best Director (Ethan Coen and Joel Coen). Earlier in 2007 it was nominated for the Palme d'Or at the Cannes Film Festival. The Screen Actors Guild gave a nomination nod to the cast for its "Outstanding Performance". The film won top honors at the Directors Guild of America Awards for Joel and Ethan Coen. The film was nominated for nine BAFTAs in 2008 and won in three categories; Joel and Ethan Coen winning the award for Best Director, Roger Deakins winning for Best Cinematography and Javier Bardem winning for Best Supporting Actor. It has also been awarded the David di Donatello for Best Foreign Film.

No Country for Old Men received recognition from numerous North American critics' associations (New York Film Critics Circle, Toronto Film Critics Association, Washington D.C. Area Film Critics Association, National Board of Review, New York Film Critics Online, Chicago Film Critics Association, Boston Society of Film Critics, Austin Film Critics Association, and San Diego Film Critics Society). The American Film Institute listed it as an AFI Movie of the Year for 2007, and the Australian Film Critics Association and Houston Film Critics Society both voted it best film of 2007.

The film appeared on more critics' top ten lists (354) than any other film of 2007, and was more critics' No. 1 film (90) than any other.

In 2021, members of Writers Guild of America West (WGAW) and Writers Guild of America, East (WGAE) ranked its screenplay 5th in WGA’s 101 Greatest Screenplays of the 21st Century (so far). In June 2025, the film ranked number 6 on The New York Times' list of "The 100 Best Movies of the 21st Century" and ranked number 3 on its "Readers' Choice" list. In July 2025, it ranked number 31 on Rolling Stone's list of "The 100 Best Movies of the 21st Century."

== Disputes ==
Tommy Lee Jones sued Paramount for bonuses and improper expense deductions in 2008. The matter was resolved in April 2010, with the company paying Jones a $17.5 million box office bonus after a determination that his deal was misdrafted by studio attorneys. Those studio attorneys settled with Paramount for $2.6 million over that error.

== See also ==
- List of films featuring psychopaths and sociopaths

== Works cited ==
- Alvarez-López, Esther (2007), En/clave De Frontera, Homenaje Al Profesor, Urbano Vinuela Angulo, Oviedo, Spain: Publicaciones de la Universidad De Oviedo, ISBN 978-84-8317-681-8
- Boule', Jean-Pierre; McCaffrey, Enda (2009), Existentialism and Contemporary Cinema: A Sartrean Perspective, Berghahn Books, ISBN 978-0-85745-320-4
- Chapman King, Lynnea; Wallach, Rick; Welsh, Jim (2009), No Country for Old Men: From Novel to Film, Lanham: The Scarecrow Press, ISBN 978-0-8108-6729-1
- Conard, Mark T. (2009), The Philosophy of The Coen Brothers, Lexington, Kentucky: University Press of Kentucky, ISBN 978-0-8131-2526-8
- Doom, Ryan P. (2009), The Brothers Coen: Unique Characters of Violence, Santa Barbara, California: ABC-CLIO, LLC, ISBN 978-0-313-35598-1
- Durand, Kevin K.; Leigh, Mary K. (2011), Riddle me this. Batman!: essays on the universe of the Dark Knight, Jefferson, North Carolina: McFarland & Company, Inc., ISBN 978-0-7864-4629-2
- Graham, Don (2011), State of Minds: Texas Culture & Its Discontents, Austin, TX: University of Texas Press, ISBN 978-0-292-72361-0
- Hurbis-Cherrier, Mick (2012), Voice & Vision: A Creative Approach to Narrative Film & DV Production, Second Edition, Burlington, MA: Focal Press/Elsevier, ISBN 978-0-240-81158-1
- Luhr, William (2012), Film Noir, West Sussex, UK: John Wiley and Sons, ISBN 978-1-4051-4594-7
- McMahon, Jennifer L.; Csaki, Steve (2010), The Philosophy of the Western, Lexington, Kentucky: The University Press of Kentucky, ISBN 978-0-8131-2591-6
- Monaco, Paul (2010), A History of American Movies: A Film-by-Film Look at the Art, Craft, and Business of Cinema, Lanham, Maryland: Scarecrow Press, ISBN 978-0-8108-7433-6
- Olson, Danel (2011), 21st Century Gothic: Great Gothic Novels Since 2000, Lanham, MD: Scarecrow Press, Inc., ISBN 978-0-8108-7728-3
- Piazza, Roberta; Bednarek, Monika; Rossi, Fabio (2011), Telecinematic Discourse: Approaches to the Language of Films and Television Series, Philadelphia, PA: John Benjamins Publishing Co., ISBN 978-90-272-8515-7
- Roman, James (2009), Bigger than Blockbusters: Movies that Defined America, Westport, CT: Greenwood Press, ISBN 978-0-313-33995-0
- Spurgeon, Sara L. (2011), Cormac McCarthy: All the Pretty Horses/No Country for Old Men/The Road, London: Continuum International Publishing Group, ISBN 978-0-8264-3820-1
- Young, Alison (2010), The Scene of Violence: Cinema, Crime, Affect, New York, NY: Routledge, ISBN 978-0-415-49071-9
- Script of No Country for Old Men by Joel Coen and Ethan Coen, based on the Novel by Cormac McCarthy (Draft), raindance.org
- Dialogue transcript of No Country for Old Men. Screenplay by Joel Coen and Ethan Coen, based on the Novel by Cormac McCarthy, script-o-rama.com
- "At the Border: the Limits of Knowledge in The Three Burials of Melquiades Estrada and No Country for Old Men", Movie: A Journal of Film Criticism, No. 1, 2010
- "No Country for Old Men: Out in all that dark", by Jim Emerson, November 27, 2007, suntimes.com
- "Blood and time: Cormac McCarthy and the twilight of the West", by Roger D. Hodge, Feb 2006, harpers.org
- "'No Country' hits home" (a letter to Critic Roger Ebert), rogerebert.com
- Killing Joke: The Coen brothers' twists and turns, by David Denby, February 25, 2008, The New Yorker
- Rescripting the Western in 'No Country for Old Men', by Sergio Rizzo, January 14, 2011, PopMatters.com–PopMatters Media
- Politics and Film: Spiraling Downward: America in 'Days of Heaven,' 'In the Valley of Elah,' and 'No Country for Old Men', by Joan Mellen, November 16, 2005, joanmellen.net appeared in a slightly different version in FILM QUARTERLY, Vol. 61, No. 3, Spring 2008, University of California Press
- 'No Country for Old Men' – Study of Coen's Masterpiece, July 18, 2010, sachinwalia.net
- The art of murdering: a multimodal-stylistic analysis of Anton Chigurh's speech in 'No Country for Old Men', by Elisabetta Zurru, 2009, Online Proceedings of the Annual Conference of the Poetics and Linguistics Association (PALA)
- Chigurh's Coin: Karma and Chance in 'No Country For Old Men', by William Ferraioloa, June, 2009, Deltacollege.Academia.edu
