= List of accolades received by Juno =

The following is a list of accolades received by the Fox Searchlight Pictures coming-of-age comedy-drama film Juno (2007).

== Accolades ==
Award	Category	Recipient(s)	Result
Academy Awards	Best Picture	Lianne Halfon, Mason Novick and Russell Smith	Nominated
Academy Awards	Best Director	Jason Reitman	Nominated
Academy Awards	Best Actress	Elliot Page (Note: Credited as Ellen Page; Juno was released before Page came out as transgender.)	Nominated
Academy Awards	Best Original Screenplay	Diablo Cody	Won
AARP Movies for Grownups Awards	Best Comedy		Nominated
Argentine Academy of Cinematography Arts and Sciences Awards	Best Foreign Film	Jason Reitman	Nominated
American Film Institute Awards	Movie of the Year		Won
African-American Film Critics Association Awards	Best Picture		7th Place
Alliance of Women Film Journalists	Best Actress	Elliot Page	Nominated
Alliance of Women Film Journalists	Best Breakthrough Performance	Elliot Page	Won
Alliance of Women Film Journalists	Best Original Screenplay	Diablo Cody	Won
Alliance of Women Film Journalists	Best Woman Screenwriter	Diablo Cody	Nominated
Alliance of Women Film Journalists	Best Seduction	Elliot Page and Michael Cera	Nominated
Alliance of Women Film Journalists	Best Ensemble Cast		Won
Amanda Awards	Best Foreign Feature Film	Jason Reitman	Nominated
American Cinema Editors Awards	Best Edited Feature Film – Comedy or Musical	Dana E. Glauberman	Nominated
Argentinean Film Critics Association Awards	Best Foreign Film	Jason Reitman	Nominated
Artios Awards	Outstanding Achievement in Casting for a Studio Feature – Comedy	Mindy Marin, Coreen Mayrs and Heike Brandstatter	Won
Austin Film Critics Association Awards	Top 10 Films		3rd Place
Austin Film Critics Association Awards	Best Film		Nominated
Austin Film Critics Association Awards	Best Actress	Elliot Page	Won
Austin Film Critics Association Awards	Best Supporting Actress	Allison Janney	Won
Austin Film Critics Association Awards	Best Original Screenplay	Diablo Cody	Won
Austin Film Critics Association Awards	Breakthrough Artist	Michael Cera (for Superbad)	Won
Bodil Awards	Best American Film	Jason Reitman	Nominated
British Academy Film Awards	Best Actress in a Leading Role	Elliot Page	Nominated
British Academy Film Awards	Best Original Screenplay	Diablo Cody	Won
Canadian Comedy Awards	Best Direction	Jason Reitman	Won
Canadian Comedy Awards	Best Performance by a Male	Michael Cera	Nominated
Canadian Comedy Awards	Best Performance by a Female	Elliot Page	Won
Chicago Film Critics Association Awards	Best Director	Jason Reitman	Nominated
Chicago Film Critics Association Awards	Best Actress	Elliot Page	Won
Chicago Film Critics Association Awards	Best Original Screenplay	Diablo Cody	Won
Chicago Film Critics Association Awards	Most Promising Performer	Michael Cera (for Superbad)	Won
Chlotrudis Awards	Best Actress	Elliot Page	Nominated
Chlotrudis Awards	Best Supporting Actor	J. K. Simmons	Nominated
Chlotrudis Awards	Best Supporting Actress	Allison Janney	Nominated
Chlotrudis Awards	Best Original Screenplay	Diablo Cody	Nominated
Christopher Awards	Feature Films		Won
Cinema for Peace Awards	Most Valuable Film of the Year	Jason Reitman	Nominated
Costume Designers Guild Awards	Excellence in Contemporary Film	Monique Prudhomme	Nominated
Critics' Choice Movie Awards	Best Picture		Nominated
Critics' Choice Movie Awards	Best Comedy Movie		Won
Critics' Choice Movie Awards	Best Actress	Elliot Page	Nominated
Critics' Choice Movie Awards	Best Young Actor	Michael Cera	Nominated
Critics' Choice Movie Awards	Best Writer	Diablo Cody	Won
Critics' Choice Movie Awards	Best Acting Ensemble		Nominated
Dallas–Fort Worth Film Critics Association Awards	Best Picture		Nominated
Dallas–Fort Worth Film Critics Association Awards	Best Actress	Elliot Page	Nominated
Dallas–Fort Worth Film Critics Association Awards	Best Screenplay	Diablo Cody	Won
Detroit Film Critics Society Awards	Best Film		Nominated
Detroit Film Critics Society Awards	Best Director	Jason Reitman	Nominated
Detroit Film Critics Society Awards	Best Actress	Elliot Page	Won
Detroit Film Critics Society Awards	Best Ensemble		Won
Detroit Film Critics Society Awards	Best Newcomer	Michael Cera (for Superbad)	Nominated
Detroit Film Critics Society Awards	Best Newcomer	Diablo Cody (as a writer)	Won
Dublin Film Critics Circle Awards	Best Actress	Elliot Page	3rd Place
Dublin Film Critics Circle Awards	Breakthrough Artist	Elliot Page	5th Place
Empire Awards	Best Actress	Elliot Page	Nominated
Florida Film Critics Circle Awards	Best Actress	Elliot Page	Won
Florida Film Critics Circle Awards	Best Screenplay	Diablo Cody	Won
Florida Film Critics Circle Awards	Pauline Kael Breakout Award	Elliot Page	Won
Gijón International Film Festival	Grand Prix	Jason Reitman	Nominated
Gijón International Film Festival	Special Prize of the Young Jury	Jason Reitman	Won
Gold Derby Awards	Best Motion Picture	Lianne Halfon, Mason Novick and Russell Smith	Nominated
Gold Derby Awards	Best Actress	Elliot Page	Nominated
Gold Derby Awards	Best Supporting Actress	Jennifer Garner	Nominated
Gold Derby Awards	Best Original Screenplay	Diablo Cody	Won
Gold Derby Awards	Best Ensemble Cast	Jason Bateman, Michael Cera, Jennifer Garner, Allison Janney, Elliot Page, J.K. Simmons and Olivia Thirlby	Nominated
Golden Globe Awards	Best Motion Picture – Musical or Comedy		Nominated
Golden Globe Awards	Best Actress in a Motion Picture – Musical or Comedy	Elliot Page	Nominated
Golden Globe Awards	Best Screenplay – Motion Picture	Diablo Cody	Nominated
Golden Schmoes Awards	Favorite Movie of the Year		Nominated
Golden Schmoes Awards	Best Comedy of the Year		Nominated
Golden Schmoes Awards	Best Actress of the Year	Elliot Page	Won
Golden Schmoes Awards	Best Supporting Actress of the Year	Jennifer Garner	Nominated
Golden Schmoes Awards	Best Screenplay of the Year	Diablo Cody	Nominated
Golden Schmoes Awards	Breakthrough Performance of the Year	Elliot Page	Won
Golden Schmoes Awards	Best Music in a Movie		Nominated
Golden Schmoes Awards	Most Overrated Movie of the Year		Nominated
Golden Trailer Awards	Best Comedy		Nominated
Golden Trailer Awards	Best Comedy TV Spot		Nominated
Gotham Independent Film Awards	Breakthrough Actor	Elliot Page	Won
Grammy Awards	Best Compilation Soundtrack Album for a Motion Picture, Television or Other Visual Media	Juno	Won
Houston Film Critics Society Awards	Top 10 Films		2nd Place
Houston Film Critics Society Awards	Best Picture		Nominated
Houston Film Critics Society Awards	Best Actress	Elliot Page	Nominated
Houston Film Critics Society Awards	Best Screenplay	Diablo Cody	Won
Humanitas Prize	Feature Film	Diablo Cody	Nominated
Independent Spirit Awards	Best Feature		Won
Independent Spirit Awards	Best Director	Jason Reitman	Nominated
Independent Spirit Awards	Best Female Lead	Elliot Page	Won
Independent Spirit Awards	Best First Screenplay	Diablo Cody	Won
IndieWire Critics Poll	Best Lead Performance	Elliot Page	10th Place
Kansas City Film Critics Circle Awards	Best Original Screenplay	Diablo Cody	Won
L'Alpe d'Huez Film Festival	Grand Prix	Jason Reitman	Won
MTV Movie Awards	Best Movie		Nominated
MTV Movie Awards	Best Male Performance	Michael Cera	Nominated
MTV Movie Awards	Best Female Performance	Elliot Page	Won
MTV Movie Awards	Best Kiss	Elliot Page and Michael Cera	Nominated
Nastro d'Argento	Best Non-European Director	Jason Reitman	Won
National Board of Review Awards	Top Ten Films		Won
National Board of Review Awards	Breakthrough Female Performance	Elliot Page	Won
National Board of Review Awards	Best Original Screenplay	Diablo Cody	Won
National Movie Awards	Best Comedy		Won
National Movie Awards	Best Performance (Female)	Elliot Page	Nominated
New York Film Critics Circle Awards	Best Actress	Elliot Page	Runner-up
New York Film Critics Circle Awards	Best Screenplay	Diablo Cody	Runner-up
New York Film Critics Online Awards	Top 11 Films		Won
New York Film Critics Online Awards	Best Breakthrough Performance	Elliot Page	Won
North Texas Film Critics Association Awards	Best Picture		Won
North Texas Film Critics Association Awards	Best Director	Jason Reitman	Won (Note: Tied with Joel and Ethan Coen for No Country for Old Men.)
North Texas Film Critics Association Awards	Best Actress	Elliot Page	Won
Online Film Critics Society Awards	Best Picture		Nominated
Online Film Critics Society Awards	Best Actress	Elliot Page	Nominated
Online Film Critics Society Awards	Best Supporting Actress	Jennifer Garner	Nominated
Online Film Critics Society Awards	Best Original Screenplay	Diablo Cody	Won
Palm Springs International Film Festival	Chairman's Vanguard Award	Jason Reitman	Won
Producers Guild of America Awards	Outstanding Producer of Theatrical Motion Pictures	Lianne Halfon, Mason Novick and Russell Smith	Nominated
Robert Awards	Best American Film	Jason Reitman	Nominated
Rome Film Festival	Golden Marc'Aurelio	Jason Reitman	Won
Russian National Movie Awards	Best Low-Budget/Arthouse Film	Jason Reitman	Nominated
San Diego Film Critics Society Awards	Best Actress	Elliot Page	Nominated
San Diego Film Critics Society Awards	Best Original Screenplay	Diablo Cody	Won
Santa Barbara International Film Festival	Virtuoso Award	Elliot Page	Won
Satellite Awards (2007)	Best Motion Picture – Musical or Comedy		Won
Satellite Awards (2007)	Best Actress in a Motion Picture – Musical or Comedy	Elliot Page	Nominated
Satellite Awards (2007)	Best Original Screenplay	Diablo Cody	Won
Satellite Awards (2008)	Outstanding Overall DVD		Nominated
Screen Actors Guild Awards	Outstanding Performance by a Female Actor in a Leading Role	Elliot Page	Nominated
St. Louis Gateway Film Critics Association Awards	Best Film		Nominated
St. Louis Gateway Film Critics Association Awards	Best Comedy or Musical Film		Won
St. Louis Gateway Film Critics Association Awards	Most Original, Innovative or Creative Film		Nominated
St. Louis Gateway Film Critics Association Awards	Best Actress	Elliot Page	Won
St. Louis Gateway Film Critics Association Awards	Best Screenplay	Diablo Cody	Won
St. Louis Gateway Film Critics Association Awards	Best Score	Mateo Messina	Nominated
St. Louis International Film Festival	Best Feature (Audience Choice Award)	Jason Reitman	Won
Stockholm International Film Festival	Audience Award	Jason Reitman	Won
Teen Choice Awards	Choice Movie – Comedy		Won
Teen Choice Awards	Choice Movie Actor – Comedy	Michael Cera (for Superbad)	Nominated
Teen Choice Awards	Choice Movie Breakout – Male	Michael Cera (for Superbad)	Nominated
Teen Choice Awards	Choice Movie Actress – Comedy	Elliot Page	Won
Teen Choice Awards	Choice Movie Breakout – Female	Elliot Page	Won
Toronto Film Critics Association Awards	Best Actress	Elliot Page	Won (Note: Tied with Julie Christie for Away from Her.)
Toronto Film Critics Association Awards	Best Screenplay	Diablo Cody	Runner-up
Toronto International Film Festival	People's Choice Award	Jason Reitman	Runner-up
Vancouver Film Critics Circle Awards	Best Director	Jason Reitman	Nominated
Vancouver Film Critics Circle Awards	Best Actress	Elliot Page	Nominated
Village Voice Film Poll	Best Actress	Elliot Page	5th Place
Washington D.C. Area Film Critics Association Awards	Best Breakthrough Performance	Elliot Page	Won
Washington D.C. Area Film Critics Association Awards	Best Original Screenplay	Diablo Cody	Won
Women Film Critics Circle Awards	Best Movie About Women	Jason Reitman	Won
Women Film Critics Circle Awards	Best Woman Storyteller	Diablo Cody	Won
Writers Guild of America Awards	Best Original Screenplay	Diablo Cody	Won
