= List of accolades received by Ratatouille =

Ratatouille accolades
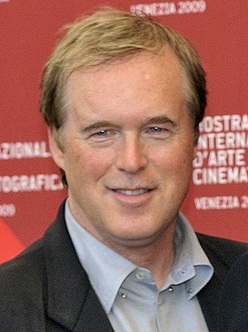
- Brad Bird received several accolades for his direction.
Accolades
Award	Wins	Nominations
Academy Awards	1	5
American Cinema Editors Eddie Awards	0	1
American Film Institute Awards	1	1
Annie Awards	9	13
Art Directors Guild Awards	0	1
Austin Film Critics Association Awards	1	1
Boston Society of Film Critics Awards	1	1
British Academy Film Awards	1	1
Chicago Film Critics Association Awards	1	2
Christopher Awards		1
Critics' Choice Awards	1	1
Dallas–Fort Worth Film Critics Association Awards	1	1
Empire Awards	0	2
Florida Film Critics Circle Awards	1	1
Golden Globe Awards	1	1
Golden Reel Awards	1	1
Golden Trailer Awards	0	1
Grammy Awards	1	1
Hollywood Film Awards	1	2
International Cinephile Society Awards	1	1
Kansas City Film Critics Circle	1	1
Kids' Choice Awards	1	1
Los Angeles Film Critics Association Awards	1	1
National Board of Review Awards	1	1
Online Film Critics Society Awards	1	2
People's Choice Awards	0	1
Producers Guild of America Awards	1	1
San Diego Film Critics Society Awards	1	1
Satellite Awards	2	3
Saturn Awards	2	2
St. Louis Film Critics Association Awards	1	1
Toronto Film Critics Association Awards	1	1
Visual Effects Society Awards	3	4
Washington D.C. Area Film Critics Association Awards	1	1
World Soundtrack Awards	0	1
Young Artist Awards	1	1

Totals (Note: Certain award groups do not simply award one winner. They acknowledge several different recipients, have runners-up, and have third place. Since this is a specific recognition and is different from losing an award, runner-up mentions are considered wins in this award tally. For simplification and to avoid errors, each award in this list has been presumed to have had a prior nomination.)
- Wins: 42
- Nominations: 62

Ratatouille is a 2007 American animated comedy-drama film produced by Pixar Animation Studios and distributed by Walt Disney Pictures. The eighth film produced by Pixar, it was written and directed by Brad Bird and produced by Brad Lewis, from an original idea by Jan Pinkava, who was credited for conceiving the film's story with Bird and Jim Capobianco but left Pixar before the film was completed. The film stars the voices of Patton Oswalt, Lou Romano, Ian Holm, Janeane Garofalo, Peter O'Toole, Brian Dennehy, Peter Sohn and Brad Garrett. Set mostly in Paris, the plot follows Remy (Oswalt), a young rat who dreams of becoming a chef and tries to achieve his goal by forming an unlikely alliance with a Parisian restaurant's garbage boy (Romano).

Ratatouille premiered on June 22, 2007, at the Kodak Theatre in Los Angeles, California, with its general release on June 29, in the United States. Releases in other territories followed through the end of 2007. Produced on a budget of $150 million, Ratatouille grossed $623 million worldwide, finishing its original theatrical run as the sixth highest-grossing film of 2007 and the year's second highest-grossing animated film (behind Shrek the Third). The film received widespread critical acclaim, with praise directed at its screenplay, animation, humor, voice acting, and Giacchino's score. (Note: Attributed to multiple sources:) On the review aggregator website Rotten Tomatoes, the film holds an approval rating of 96% based on 253 reviews. The film is considered one of the best films of 2007, having appeared on several critics' top ten lists. It has since been regarded as one of the greatest animated films of the 21st century and all time. (Note: Attributed to multiple sources:)

Ratatouille garnered awards and nominations in several categories, including for its animations, screenplay and score. At the 80th Academy Awards, the film was nominated in five categories, including Best Original Screenplay, and won Best Animated Feature. It received thirteen nominations at the 35th Annual Annie Awards, winning nine, including Best Voice Acting in a Feature Production (Holm), Best Writing in an Animated Feature and Best Directing in an Animated Feature (both Bird), as well as Best Animated Feature. Ratatouille also won Best Animated Film at the 61st British Academy Film Awards, Best Animated Feature at the 13th Critics' Choice Awards and the 79th National Board of Review Awards, as well as Best Animated Feature Film at the 65th Golden Globe Awards. In addition, Ratatouille was named one of the Top 10 Films of 2007 by the American Film Institute.

== Accolades ==
Accolades received by Ratatouille
Award	Date of ceremony	Category	Recipient(s)	Result	Ref.
Academy Awards	February 24, 2008	Best Original Screenplay	Brad Bird, Jan Pinkava and Jim Capobianco	Nominated	
Academy Awards	February 24, 2008	Best Animated Feature	Brad Bird	Won	
Academy Awards	February 24, 2008	Best Original Score	Michael Giacchino	Nominated	
Academy Awards	February 24, 2008	Best Sound Editing	Randy Thom and Michael Silvers	Nominated	
Academy Awards	February 24, 2008	Best Sound Mixing	Randy Thom, Michael Semanick and Doc Kane	Nominated	
American Cinema Editors Eddie Awards	February 17, 2008	Best Edited Film – Comedy or Musical	Darren T. Holmes	Nominated	
American Film Institute Awards	December 8, 2007	Top 10 Films of the Year	Ratatouille	Won (Note: This award does not have a single winner, but recognizes multiple films.)	
Annie Awards	February 8, 2008	Best Animated Feature	Pixar Animation Studios	Won	
Annie Awards	February 8, 2008	Best Animated Effects	Gary Bruins	Nominated	
Annie Awards	February 8, 2008	Best Animated Effects	Jon Reisch	Nominated	
Annie Awards	February 8, 2008	Character Animation in a Feature Production	Michal Makarewicz	Won	
Annie Awards	February 8, 2008	Best Character Design in an Animated Feature Production	Carter Goodrich	Won	
Annie Awards	February 8, 2008	Best Directing in an Animated Feature Production	Brad Bird	Won	
Annie Awards	February 8, 2008	Best Music in an Animated Feature Production	Michael Giacchino	Won	
Annie Awards	February 8, 2008	Best Production Design in an Animated Feature Production	Harley Jessup	Won	
Annie Awards	February 8, 2008	Best Storyboarding in an Animated Feature Production	Ted Mathot	Won	
Annie Awards	February 8, 2008	Best Voice Acting in an Animated Feature Production	Janeane Garofalo	Nominated	
Annie Awards	February 8, 2008	Best Voice Acting in an Animated Feature Production	Ian Holm	Won	
Annie Awards	February 8, 2008	Best Voice Acting in an Animated Feature Production	Patton Oswalt	Nominated	
Annie Awards	February 8, 2008	Best Writing in an Animated Feature Production	Brad Bird	Won	
Art Directors Guild Awards	February 14, 2008	Excellence in Production Design for a Fantasy Feature Film	Harley Jessup	Nominated	
Austin Film Critics Association Awards	December 20, 2007	Best Animated Film	Ratatouille	Won	
Boston Society of Film Critics Awards	December 9, 2007	Best Screenplay	Brad Bird	Won	
British Academy Film Awards	February 10, 2008	Best Animated Film	Ratatouille	Won	
Chicago Film Critics Association Awards	December 13, 2007	Best Animated Feature	Ratatouille	Won	
Chicago Film Critics Association Awards	December 13, 2007	Best Original Screenplay	Brad Bird	Nominated	
Christopher Awards	April 10, 2008	Feature Films	Ratatouille	Won (Note: Shared with Amazing Grace, The Diving Bell and the Butterfly (film), The Great Debaters, Juno, and The Kite Runner)	
Critics' Choice Awards	January 7, 2008	Best Animated Feature	Ratatouille	Won	
Dallas-Fort Worth Film Critics Association Awards	December 17, 2007	Best Animated Feature	Ratatouille	Won	
Empire Awards	March 9, 2008	Best Film	Ratatouille	Nominated	
Empire Awards	March 9, 2008	Best Comedy	Ratatouille	Nominated	
Florida Film Critics Circle Awards	December 12, 2007	Best Animated Film	Ratatouille	Won	
Golden Globe Awards	January 13, 2008	Best Animated Film	Ratatouille	Won	
Golden Reel Awards	February 21, 2008	Best Sound Effects, Foley, Dialogue and ADR for Feature Film Animation	Randy Thom, Michael Silvers, Teresa Eckton, Kyrsten Mate, Steve Slanec, Sue Fox, Al Nelson, Stephen M. Davis, Dennie Thorpe, Jana Vance, Ellen Heuer	Won	
Golden Trailer Awards	May 8, 2008	Best Animation/Family TV Spot	Walt Disney Pictures and Craig Murray Productions (for "One Word Kids")	Nominated	
Grammy Awards	February 10, 2008	Best Score Soundtrack Album	Michael Giacchino	Won	
Hollywood Film Awards	October 27, 2007	Animation of the Year	Ratatouille	Won	
Hollywood Film Awards	October 27, 2007	Movie of the Year	Ratatouille	Nominated	
International Cinephile Society Awards	February 12, 2008	Best Animated Film	Ratatouille	Runner-up	
Kansas City Film Critics Circle Awards	January 12, 2008	Best Animated Film	Ratatouille	Won	
Kids' Choice Awards	March 29, 2008	Favorite Animated Movie	Ratatouille	Won	
Los Angeles Film Critics Association Awards	December 9, 2007	Best Animated Film	Ratatouille	Won (Note: Tied with Persepolis)	
National Board of Review Awards	December 5, 2007	Best Animated Feature	Ratatouille	Won	
Online Film Critics Society Awards	January 9, 2008	Best Animated Film	Ratatouille	Won	
Online Film Critics Society Awards	January 9, 2008	Best Original Screenplay	Brad Bird	Nominated	
People's Choice Awards	January 8, 2008	Favorite Family Movie	Ratatouille	Nominated	
Producers Guild of America Awards	February 2, 2008	Producer of the Year Award in Animated Motion Pictures	Brad Lewis	Won	
San Diego Film Critics Society Awards	December 18, 2007	Best Animated Film	Ratatouille	Won	
Satellite Awards	December 17, 2007	Best Motion Picture, Animated or Mixed Media	Ratatouille	Won	
Satellite Awards	December 17, 2007	Best Original Score	Michael Giacchino	Nominated	
Satellite Awards	December 17, 2007	Outstanding Youth DVD	Ratatouille	Won	
Saturn Awards	June 24, 2008	Best Animated Film	Ratatouille	Won	
Saturn Awards	June 24, 2008	Best Writing	Brad Bird	Won	
St. Louis Film Critics Association Awards	December 21, 2007	Best Animated or Children's Film	Ratatouille	Won	
Toronto Film Critics Association Awards	December 18, 2007	Best Animated Film	Ratatouille	Won	
Visual Effects Society Awards	February 10, 2008	Outstanding Performance by an Animated Character in an Animated Motion Picture	Janeane Garofalo, Jaime Landes, Konishi Sonoko and Paul Aichele (for "Colette")	Won	
Visual Effects Society Awards	February 10, 2008	Outstanding Effects in an Animated Motion Picture	Darwyn Peachey, Chen Shen, Eric Froemling & Tolga Goktekin (for "Rapids")	Nominated	
Visual Effects Society Awards	February 10, 2008	Outstanding Effects in an Animated Motion Picture	Jon Reisch, Jason Johnston, Eric Froemling & Tolga Goktekin (for "Food")	Won	
Visual Effects Society Awards	February 10, 2008	Outstanding Supporting Visual Effects in a Motion Picture	Michael Fong, Apurva Shah, Christine Waggoner and Michael Fu	Won	
Washington D.C. Area Film Critics Association Awards	December 10, 2007	Best Animated Feature	Ratatouille	Won	
World Soundtrack Awards	October 20, 2007	Best Original Song	Michael Giacchino & Camille (for "Le Festin")	Nominated	
Young Artist Awards	March 30, 2008	Best Family Feature Film (Animation)	Ratatouille	Won	
