= Tully (2018 film) =

2018 film by Jason Reitman

- Theatrical release poster
- Directed by: Jason Reitman
- Written by: Diablo Cody
- Produced by: Aaron L. Gilbert; Jason Reitman; Helen Estabrook; Diablo Cody; Mason Novick; Charlize Theron; A.J. Dix; Beth Kono
- Starring: Charlize Theron; Mackenzie Davis; Mark Duplass; Ron Livingston
- Cinematography: Eric Steelberg
- Edited by: Stefan Grube
- Music by: Rob Simonsen
- Production companies: Bron Studios; Right of Way Films; Denver and Delilah Productions
- Distributed by: Focus Features (select territories); Sierra/Affinity (International)
- Release dates: January 23, 2018 (Sundance); May 4, 2018 (United States)
- Running time: 95 minutes
- Country: United States
- Language: English
- Box office: $15.6 million

Tully is a 2018 American comedy-drama film directed by Jason Reitman, written by Diablo Cody, and starring Charlize Theron, Mackenzie Davis, Mark Duplass, and Ron Livingston. The film follows the friendship between a mother of three and her night nanny. It is the third collaboration between Reitman and Cody, following the films Juno (2007) and Young Adult (2011), the latter of which also starred Theron.

The film premiered at the 2018 Sundance Film Festival and was released in the United States by Focus Features on May 4, 2018. It received generally positive reviews from critics, who praised Theron and Davis's performances and the film's portrayal of motherhood. Theron was nominated for Best Actress – Motion Picture Musical or Comedy at the 76th Golden Globe Awards and Best Actress in a Comedy Movie at the 24th Critics' Choice Awards.

== Plot ==
Marlo is pregnant with an unplanned third child with her husband Drew. They have a daughter, Sarah, and a son, Jonah, who has an undiagnosed behavioral disorder. Trying to reduce his sensitivity to external stimuli, Marlo brushes his skin nightly. Craig, Marlo's wealthy brother, offers to pay for a night nanny as a baby gift, but she rebuffs him. Marlo has dreams of an underwater mermaid, and also of her son's tantrums.

After giving birth to a girl, Mia, Marlo quickly becomes even more overwhelmed and exhausted than before. After the principal of Jonah's school again recommends that he be placed in a different school because they cannot handle him, Marlo erupts at her and leaves angrily. Afterwards she gets out the phone number for the night nanny.

That night, Tully, the nanny, arrives at Marlo's house and immediately settles in to take control. Despite initial awkwardness, they develop a close friendship over the course of several nights. Tully proves to be an exceptional nanny and also cleans the house and bakes cupcakes for Jonah's class. Tully explains that she is there mostly not for Mia herself, but to help and support Marlo. Marlo begins re-engaging with her family and self, singing, cooking nice family meals, and having fun with her kids. When Marlo mentions that she and Drew have not had sex for some time, and that Drew has a fantasy about diner waitresses, Tully puts on a waitress uniform that Marlo had previously purchased but never used and, with Marlo coaching, has sex with Drew.

One night Tully arrives visibly distressed. She has fought with her "enmeshed" roommate, due to her roommate's anger over her bringing home men. Tully impulsively suggests going into the city for drinks, to which Marlo reluctantly agrees; they drive to Marlo's old neighborhood, Bushwick, Brooklyn. At a bar Tully suddenly tells her she can no longer work for her anymore, explaining that she was there only to "bridge a gap." Marlo yells at Tully for being immature and not understanding how aging is going to steal Tully's youthful body and demeanor. Marlo impulsively steals a bike and rides to her former girlfriend’s apartment, where Marlo herself used to live, but no one answers the door. Tully suggests she may be taking things too far. When Marlo's breast becomes painfully engorged with milk, Tully takes her into a bar bathroom and helps her express the milk. On their way home, Marlo falls asleep at the wheel, ends up in a river trapped underwater in the car, and Tully as a mermaid comes to rescue her.

She is taken to a hospital, where a psychiatrist informs a surprised Drew that Marlo was suffering from extreme sleep deprivation and exhaustion. Drew admits he does not know much about the nanny, and when asked for Marlo's maiden name, he says "Tully".

In flashbacks, events that Marlo and Tully experienced together now show Marlo alone. Tully comes to Marlo's hospital room to say goodbye, and each thanks the other for keeping her alive before Tully leaves. Drew reenters and apologizes to Marlo for not realizing what she was going through and affirms his love of her and their family, which she reciprocates.

At home, Marlo goes to brush Jonah, but he questions whether the procedure is "real", and they decide they no longer need to do it. Jonah says his favorite part of the procedure was always just being with his mother, and they embrace. Marlo goes to the kitchen and puts in earbuds to listen to music while she prepares the kids' lunches for the next day. Drew comes in, takes one of the earbuds, and helps to chop food up while they listen to the music together.

== Cast ==
- Charlize Theron as Marlo Moreau
- Mackenzie Davis as Tully
- Ron Livingston as Drew Moreau
- Asher Miles Fallica as Jonah
- Lia Frankland as Sarah
- Mark Duplass as Craig Freehauf
- Elaine Tan as Elyse
- Gameela Wright as Laurie
- Diane Lane as Corrine 'Third Degree' Burns

== Production ==
Diablo Cody wrote the film as a way of dealing with her own difficult pregnancy. The script helped her, becoming "a glowing, soothing presence I could return to whenever I felt overwhelmed." Reitman noted, according to Cody, that Tully fits together thematically with their previous collaborations, logically concluding an unintentional trilogy where "Juno is about being prematurely thrust into adulthood, Young Adult is about resisting adulthood, and Tully is about finding grace and acceptance in midlife."

Theron said she gained nearly 50 pounds (23 kg) for the role over a period of three and a half months. She had to eat around the clock to keep the weight on, and then it took her a year and a half to take the weight off after filming wrapped.

Filming lasted from September 22 to November 2, 2016, in Vancouver, British Columbia.

== Release ==
In May 2017, Focus Features acquired distribution rights to the film in North America, the U.K., Ireland, Italy, Spain, China, Malaysia, Singapore, the Czech Republic, Slovakia, Hungary and Romania. A theatrical release date of April 20, 2018 was set; however, in March 2018 the date was pushed back to May 4.

Tully was made available for digital download on July 17, 2018, and released on Blu-ray and DVD on July 31.

== Reception ==
=== Box office ===
Tully grossed $9.3 million in the United States and Canada, and $6.2 million in other territories, for a worldwide total of $15.6 million.

In the United States and Canada, Tully was released alongside Overboard and Bad Samaritan, and was projected to gross $3–4 million from 1,353 theaters in its opening weekend. It ended up debuting to $3.2 million, which was a lower figure than Reitman's Labor Day ($5.1 million in 2014), and finishing 6th at the box office. 87% of its audience was over the age of 25. Deadline Hollywood noted that an opening of $6.5 million would have been an ideal debut for the film. It made $2.2 million in its second weekend, dropping to 8th place at the box office.

=== Critical response ===
On review aggregator Rotten Tomatoes, the film holds an approval rating of 87% based on 286 reviews, with an average rating of 7.6/10; the website's critical consensus reads: "Tully delves into the modern parenthood experience with an admirably deft blend of humor and raw honesty, brought to life by an outstanding performance by Charlize Theron." On Metacritic, the film has a weighted average score of 75 out of 100 based on 52 critics, indicating "generally favorable reviews". According to PostTrak, filmgoers gave the film an overall positive score of 73%, with audience members over the age of 25 giving it a 71% and those under 25 giving it an 87%.

David Ehrlich of IndieWire gave the film a "B", calling it "funnier than Juno and almost as ruthlessly honest as Young Adult", and saying: "Tully never pulls at your heartstrings quite as hard as it might, but there's something beautiful about the way these two women both learn to love themselves, and in a way that also makes it easier for them to love each other." Writing for Rolling Stone, Peter Travers praised the performances and script, giving the film 3.5 stars out of 4 and saying: "When the film takes a sharp turn and veers off-course in its final third, you hold on because Davis and Theron make sure you do. Together these two dynamite actresses cut to the soulful core of a movie that turns out to be funny, touching and vital."

Despite the film receiving positive reviews from many critics, one group of critics criticized the film for its portrayal of postpartum mental health. In particular, they took exception to the normalization and lack of recognition of postpartum depression or postpartum psychosis, which they deemed careless. Manohla Dargis' review in The New York Times suggested that:

Marlo very visibly sinks into postpartum depression — you can see Ms. Theron pulling Marlo deeper and deeper inside — the movie pretends that her burden is somehow too hidden for anyone to notice ... it isolates Marlo, and once again it is a woman who's the problem that needs solving.

Diana Spalding (the digital education editor for the website Motherly, a midwife, and a pediatric nurse) argued that Theron's character displays behaviors more typical of postpartum psychosis, the symptoms of which include delusions, hallucinations, periods of extreme activity, anger, paranoia, and trouble communicating. Along with other negative critics of the movie, Spalding had looked forward to seeing a film about what motherhood is truly like, but instead found the issue of postpartum mental illness "unaddressed", and Marlo's suicidal ideation normalized. This condition is dangerous to both mother and child; according to Carolyn Wagner, a maternal mental health therapist based in Chicago, "it is extremely serious, and presents a grave danger to mom and infant. It does not involve [a] fantastical imagined friend and caregiver, and it is certainly nothing to be made into a plot twist."

=== Accolades ===
Award	Date of ceremony	Category	Recipients	Result
Alliance of Women Film Journalists	2020	Best Woman Screenwriter	Diablo Cody	Nominated
Alliance of Women Film Journalists	2020	Bravest Performance	Charlize Theron	Nominated
CinEuphoria Awards	2019	Best Actress – International Competition	Charlize Theron	Nominated
Cleveland International Film Festival	2018	Best American Independent Feature Film	Jason Reitman	Nominated
Columbus Film Critics Association Awards	2020	Best Overlooked Film		Nominated
Critics' Choice Awards	January 13, 2019	Best Actress in a Comedy	Charlize Theron	Nominated
Dublin Film Critics Circle Awards	2018	Best Actress	Charlize Theron	10th place
Dorian Awards	2019	Unsung Film of the Year		Nominated
Golden Globes	January 6, 2019	Best Actress – Motion Picture Comedy or Musical	Charlize Theron	Nominated
Hawaii Film Critics Society	2019	Best Actress	Charlize Theron	Nominated
Hollywood Critics Association Awards	2018	Best Actress	Charlize Theron	Nominated
Hollywood Critics Association Awards	2018	Best Supporting Actress	Mackenzie Davis	Nominated
Hollywood Critics Association Awards	2018	Best Original Screenplay	Diablo Cody	Nominated
Jupiter Award	2019	Best International Actress	Charlize Theron	Won
Leo Awards	June 4, 2019	Best Motion Picture	Jason Reitman, Helen Estabrook, Beth Kono, Charlize Theron, Diablo Cody, Mason Novick, Ron McLeod, Aaron Gilbert	Nominated
Leo Awards	June 4, 2019	Best Costume Design in a Motion Picture	Aieisha Li	Nominated
Leo Awards	June 4, 2019	Best Visual Effects in a Motion Picture	Robin Hackl, Dave Morley, Tara Conley & Matt Yeoman	Nominated
Los Angeles Online Film Critics Society Awards	December 9, 2018	Best Actress	Charlize Theron	Nominated
Online Association of Female Critics	2018	Best Female Lead	Charlize Theron	Nominated
St. Louis Film Critics	December 16, 2018	Best Actress	Charlize Theron	Nominated
The Joey Awards	2018	Best Actress in a Feature Film Supporting/Principal Role Age 5-11	Lia Frankland	Won
Young Artist Awards	July 14, 2019	Best Performance in a Feature Film: Supporting Young Actor	Asher Miles Fallica	Nominated
Young Entertainer Awards	April 7, 2019	Best Supporting Young Actress – Feature Film	Lia Frankland	Won
