= Broadcast Film Critics Association Awards 2008 =

Broadcast Film Critics Association Awards 2008 may refer to:

- 13th Critics' Choice Awards, the thirteenth Critics' Choice Awards ceremony that took place in 2008
- 14th Critics' Choice Awards, the fourteenth Critics' Choice Awards ceremony that took place in 2009 and which honored the best in film for 2008
