= Broadcast Film Critics Association Awards 2007 =

Broadcast Film Critics Association Awards 2007 may refer to:

- 12th Critics' Choice Awards, the twelfth Critics' Choice Awards ceremony that took place in 2007
- 13th Critics' Choice Awards, the thirteenth Critics' Choice Awards ceremony that took place in 2008 and which honored the best in film for 2007
