= Lisa Frankenstein =

2024 film by Zelda Williams

- Theatrical release poster
- Directed by: Zelda Williams
- Written by: Diablo Cody
- Produced by: Mason Novick; Diablo Cody
- Starring: Kathryn Newton; Cole Sprouse; Liza Soberano; Henry Eikenberry; Joe Chrest; Carla Gugino
- Cinematography: Paula Huidobro
- Edited by: Brad Turner
- Music by: Isabella Summers
- Production companies: MXN Entertainment; Lollipop Woods
- Distributed by: Focus Features (United States); Universal Pictures (international)
- Release date: February 9, 2024
- Running time: 101 minutes
- Country: United States
- Language: English
- Budget: $13 million
- Box office: $9.9 million

Lisa Frankenstein is a 2024 American romantic comedy horror film directed by Zelda Williams, in her feature-length directorial debut, and written by Diablo Cody. The film stars Kathryn Newton, Cole Sprouse, Liza Soberano, Henry Eikenberry, Joe Chrest, and Carla Gugino. The plot follows a misunderstood teen girl named Lisa, who meets and develops a relationship with a reanimated Victorian-era corpse. Cody stated that Lisa Frankenstein is set in the same fictional universe as Jennifer's Body (2009).

Lisa Frankenstein was released in the United States by Focus Features on February 9, 2024. The film received mixed reviews from critics and grossed $9.9 million against a production budget of $13 million.

== Plot ==
In 1989, teenager Lisa Swallows is still struggling to come to terms with the loss of her mother, who was killed by an axe murderer two years earlier. Her father, Dale, has since remarried a self-obsessed woman named Janet, who also has a daughter named Taffy from a previous marriage.

Lisa heads to a party with Taffy, who encourages her to socialize. She has an awkward encounter with Michael, her crush, and is accidentally drugged by one of his friends. While under the influence, she is sexually harassed by her lab partner, Doug. Lisa returns to a local cemetery she frequently visits and speaks to the grave of a young man; a pianist who was killed via a lightning strike in 1837 after falling in love with a woman who left him for another man. A bolt of lightning strikes his grave after Lisa leaves, and the man is brought back to life as a zombie.

The man (referred to as "The Creature" in the film's credits) breaks into Lisa's house while she is home alone. Lisa is initially terrified, but eventually recognizes him as the man whose grave she dotes on, and decides to hide him in her closet. The Creature is non-speaking, covered in debris, and missing multiple body parts, all attributes of which he is ashamed.

Lisa claims that a burglar broke in to explain the mess made by the Creature, but Janet claims she is making it up for attention. When the Creature leaves a worm in Janet's food, she blames Lisa and threatens to send her to an asylum. As Janet continues to intimidate and belittle Lisa, the Creature emerges from the closet, kills Janet, and cuts off her ear. He and Lisa later dump Janet's body into the cemetery. Lisa sews Janet's ear onto the Creature, but discovers that the parts will not work without a current. They use Taffy's tanning bed to revive the ear, which also restores the Creature to a more human appearance. Lisa then lures Doug to the cemetery so that she can cut off his hand for the Creature. The Creature kills Doug and hides his body with Janet's. The Creature is thrilled that he is once again able to play the piano, and he and Lisa start to bond.

The police start to investigate Janet's and Doug's disappearances. Lisa is implicated, but refuses to cooperate with the investigation. She goes to find Michael, but accidentally catches him in bed with Taffy, leaving her devastated. The Creature enters and chops off Michael's penis, then prepares to attack Taffy before Lisa intervenes and follows him as he flees to the cemetery. Lisa gives Taffy her mother's rosary as a token of appreciation for her kindness and sympathy before pursuing the Creature into the woods.

Lisa confronts the Creature, who professes his love for her. They leave the cemetery after throwing a police officer into a grave. Lisa attaches Michael's penis to the Creature so they can have sex. With the police beginning to close in on them, Lisa implores the Creature to burn her alive in the tanning bed to avoid being arrested, to which he complies.

Some time later, Dale and Taffy visit Lisa's grave. Taffy is confused to discover that an inscription reading "Beloved Wife" has been added to Lisa's headstone, which has been damaged by lightning. The Creature is then shown sitting on a bench, reading Percy Shelley's poem O Mary Dear aloud. A resurrected Lisa lies in his lap and opens her eyes.

== Cast ==
- Kathryn Newton as Lisa, a lonely girl still reeling from her mother's axe murder
- Cole Sprouse as The Creature, a Victorian-era man who is resurrected from his grave
- Liza Soberano as Taffy, Lisa's kind, yet slightly oblivious, stepsister
- Henry Eikenberry as Michael, Lisa's crush
- Joe Chrest as Dale, Lisa's father and Taffy's stepfather
- Carla Gugino as Janet, Lisa's stepmother and Taffy's mother
- Joey Bree Harris as Tamara, Michael's friend
- Jenna Davis as Lori, Taffy's best friend
- Paola Andino as Misty, Taffy's friend
- Bryce Romero as Doug Marands, Lisa's lab partner
- Trina LaFargue as Tricia, Taffy's friend

== Production ==
Diablo Cody wrote the script for Lisa Frankenstein, and she announced that she would be producing the film with collaborator Mason Novick in June 2022. Zelda Williams made her feature-length debut as the director of the film, which was revealed to be starring Kathryn Newton and Cole Sprouse. Further casting announcements of Liza Soberano, Carla Gugino, Joe Chrest, and Henry Eikenberry were revealed in August 2022, around the time when production began filming in New Orleans, which was expected to run until September.

Some writers covering the film theorized that its title is an amalgamation of "Lisa Frank", a company known for producing brightly colored stickers and school supplies, and Frankenstein. However, Cody has stated that this play on words was unintentional. In actuality, the titular character's name is an homage to a character in the 1985 John Hughes-directed film, Weird Science, since, like Lisa Frankenstein, it features protagonists who bring their fantasy love interests to life.

== Release ==
Lisa Frankenstein was released theatrically in the United States by Focus Features on February 9, 2024. The film was released in the United Kingdom by Universal Pictures on March 1, 2024. It was released on video-on-demand (VOD) platforms in the US on February 27, 2024.

== Soundtrack ==
A cover of the REO Speedwagon single, "Can't Fight This Feeling", was sung by American singer JoJo for the soundtrack. The song was released as a single on February 9, 2024. A music video was released the day before, interspersing clips from the film and JoJo performing the song in a recording studio.

== Reception ==
=== Box office ===
In the United States and Canada, Lisa Frankenstein was projected to gross $4–6 million from 3,144 theaters in its opening weekend. The film made $1.7 million on its first day, including $700,000 from Thursday night previews. It went on to debut to $3.8 million, finishing second behind holdover Argylle. In its second weekend the film made $2.1 million, falling to ninth place.

=== Critical response ===
On the review aggregator website Rotten Tomatoes, 52% of 210 critics' reviews are positive, with an average rating of 5.6/10. The website's consensus reads: "An affectionate callback to classic horror comedies of the '80s, Lisa Frankenstein can be fun in its own right, despite not quite measuring up to the movies it imitates." Metacritic, which uses a weighted average, assigned the film a score of 47 out of 100, based on 43 critics, indicating "mixed or average" reviews. Audiences polled by CinemaScore gave the film an average grade of "B" on an A+ to F scale.

Richard Roeper of the Chicago Sun-Times gave the film two out of four stars, writing that it "suffers from Mixed Genre Syndrome and hops from horror spoof to trauma survivor story to pure camp to high school comedy, never really finding its footing." Owen Gleiberman of Variety described the film as derivative and "neither scary nor funny", calling it "a horror-com smoothie made mostly of ancient, moldy fruit." The Guardian's Benjamin Lee gave the film a score of two out of five stars, criticizing its pacing and script, and writing that, "The film feels a little trapped between two worlds, a tween sleepover comedy on the verge of full body horror". IndieWire's David Ehrlich gave the film a grade of "C", commending the performances of Newton and Sprouse but lamenting that, "Scenes have no shape to them, the world feels half-built, and the reality that supposedly holds them together is too erratic for Williams to establish any kind of emotional baseline." Robbie Collin of The Telegraph awarded the movie two stars out of five, writing that it is "hindered by its obsession with 80s cult classics."

Valerie Complex of Deadline Hollywood complimented the film's visual aesthetic and the performances of Newton and Soberano, but criticized its pacing: "[The] inconsistency in pacing, though reflective of the film's ambition to blend genres and tones, might detract from the cohesiveness of the narrative." Meagan Navarro of Bloody Disgusting characterized the film's central romance as underdeveloped, but praised Newton's performance, as well as the film's production design and humor, calling it "a cute, quirky, disjointed and harmless dark comedy that's less interested in fluid storytelling than it is championing teen weirdos and outcasts through an '80s vibe." The New York Times' Alissa Wilkinson also praised the production design, and concluded: "Brief, pleasant and fun to look at, the movie is not interested in anything more than love and being understood, and in that way it's a great callback to teen romances from an earlier era."
