= Ricki and the Flash =

2015 film directed by Jonathan Demme

- Theatrical release poster
- Directed by: Jonathan Demme
- Written by: Diablo Cody
- Produced by: Marc Platt; Diablo Cody; Mason Novick; Gary Goetzman
- Starring: Meryl Streep; Kevin Kline; Mamie Gummer; Audra McDonald; Sebastian Stan; Rick Springfield
- Cinematography: Declan Quinn
- Edited by: Wyatt Smith
- Production companies: TriStar Pictures; TriStar Productions; Badwill Entertainment; Marc Platt Productions; LStar Capital
- Distributed by: Sony Pictures Releasing
- Release date: August 7, 2015
- Running time: 101 minutes
- Country: United States
- Language: English
- Budget: $18 million
- Box office: $41.3 million

Ricki and the Flash is a 2015 American musical comedy-drama film directed by Jonathan Demme and written by Diablo Cody, about a woman who leaves her family to become a rock star and later gets a chance to make amends. The film stars Meryl Streep, Mamie Gummer, Kevin Kline, Sebastian Stan, Rick Springfield, and Audra McDonald. The film marks Streep and Kline's third collaboration after Sophie's Choice (1982) and A Prairie Home Companion (2006). It was Demme's final narrative film before his death in April 2017.

Principal photography began on October 13, 2014, in Rye, New York. TriStar Pictures financed, and released the film on August 7, 2015. The film received mixed reviews from critics, who praised the performances of the cast but criticised its screenplay and execution, and grossed $41 million against its $18–30 million production budget.

== Plot ==
Ricki chased her dreams of becoming a famous rock star by abandoning her family. She gets a chance to put things right when her ex-husband Pete asks her to visit Indianapolis and help their estranged daughter Julie through a difficult time.

Ricki has a rock band that plays a regular gig at a small bar, when she is not working as a cashier to make ends meet. Julie recently attempted suicide because her husband cheated on her and is divorcing her. Despite being broke, Ricki comes to Indianapolis to help her daughter, but Julie is hostile. Likewise, her two sons are hostile and unwelcoming. One has come out as gay and the other recently became engaged, though no one told their mother. Still, Ricki gets through to Julie.

Pete's second wife, Maureen, returns unexpectedly, confronting Ricki with some hard truths. She wasn't there for her children when they needed her and Maureen was. Ashamed, Ricki returns to her band in California angry and bitter, insulting her guitarist who is in love with her. He makes her realize he cares and they make love. Maureen sends Ricki an invitation to the son's wedding as an olive branch, but Ricki can't afford to go. Her boyfriend sells his best guitar to pay for the tickets.

Despite her attempts at reconciliation, she's clearly still an outsider. The wedding guests look askance at Ricki when she gets up to toast the bride and groom. As her gift, having no money, she has her band take over and play for the guests. Her son and his bride start the wedding dance and slowly the guests join in.

== Cast ==
- Meryl Streep as Linda Brummel / Ricki Rendazzo
- Kevin Kline as Pete Brummel
- Mamie Gummer as Julie Brummel
- Audra McDonald as Maureen Brummel
- Sebastian Stan as Joshua Brummel
- Nick Westrate as Adam Brummel
- Rick Springfield as Greg
- Ben Platt as Daniel
- Charlotte Rae as Oma Brummel, Pete's mother
- Rick Rosas as Buster
- Bernie Worrell as Billy
- Joe Vitale as Joe
- Gabriel Ebert as Max
- Carmen Carrera as Ricki's lead hairstylist
- Keala Settle as Bar Patron
- Beau Sia as Desmond
- Hailey Gates as Emily
- Gus Halper as Impatient Traveler

== Production ==
Diablo Cody based the script in part on her mother-in-law Terry Cieri, who has fronted a New Jersey bar band for years. Cody said, "I watched her on stage so many times, and I thought to myself, 'This woman's life is a movie.'" Cody specifically wrote the role of Ricki with Streep in her mind noting that actresses over 50 in Hollywood typically don't get complicated parts. Ricki's daughter is played by Streep's daughter, Mamie Gummer marking the third film the two have made together, after 1986's Heartburn and 2007's Evening."

Ricki and the Flash was dedicated to "Rick the Bass Player", which is the stage name for Rick Rosas who played "Buster", the Flash's bass player in the film, and who died in November 2014.

=== Filming ===
Principal photography was first set to begin on October 1, 2014, in New York City. Principal photography officially began on October 13, 2014, in Rye, New York. On October 14, Streep was spotted filming some scenes at Numi & Co. Hair Salon in Rye. On November 3, 2014, she was also seen filming in Nyack, New York. The wedding sequence was shot at Untermyer Park in Yonkers, New York.

== Release ==
On May 6, 2014, Sony's TriStar set the film for a June 26, 2015 release. The release date was later changed to August 7, 2015. The film was chosen as the opening selection for the 2015 Locarno Film Festival which was held on August 5, 2015, in Locarno, Switzerland.

== Reception ==
=== Box office ===
Ricki and the Flash grossed $26.8 million in the United States, and $13.3 million in other territories, for a worldwide total of $40.1 million, against a budget of $18 million. The film grossed $6.6 million from 1,603 theaters in its opening weekend, finishing 7th at the box office. The film added 461 theaters in its second week (a total of 2,064 screens), but dropped to ninth place with $4.6 million (a decline of 31 percent). In its third week the film grossed $3 million from 2,013 screens. The film opened in Italy on September 11, 2015, and came in fifth place with a weekend total of $413,800.

=== Critical response ===
On the review aggregator website Rotten Tomatoes, the film holds a rating of 64% based on 198 reviews, with an average rating of 5.9/10. The site's critical consensus reads, "Meryl Streep's outstanding work helps Ricki and the Flash overcome its inconsistent tone and fairly-predictable premise." Metacritic gives the film a weighted average score of 54 out of 100, based on 36 critics, indicating "mixed or average" reviews. Audiences polled by CinemaScore gave the film an average grade of "B" on an A+ to F scale.

IGN gave the film a score of 7.8/10, saying, "Ricki and the Flash offers a breezy, heartwarming, if somewhat manufactured tale about an aging rocker reconnecting with her family".
