= Paradise (2013 American film) =

2013 film by Diablo Cody

- Theatrical release poster
- Directed by: Diablo Cody
- Written by: Diablo Cody
- Produced by: Diablo Cody; Mason Novick
- Starring: Julianne Hough; Russell Brand; Octavia Spencer; Nick Offerman; Iliza Shlesinger; Holly Hunter; Kathleen Rose Perkins
- Cinematography: Tim Suhrstedt
- Edited by: Myron Kerstein
- Music by: Rachel Portman
- Production company: Mandate Pictures
- Distributed by: RLJE Films
- Release date: October 18, 2013
- Running time: 86 minutes
- Country: United States
- Language: English

Paradise (also known as Lamb of God) is a 2013 American comedy-drama film written and directed by Diablo Cody, in her directorial debut. It stars Julianne Hough, Russell Brand, Octavia Spencer, Holly Hunter, Iliza Shlesinger and Kathleen Rose Perkins. The title is a take on the fact that while many tourists are visiting the Las Vegas Strip, they are actually spending most of their time in the Census-Designated Place of Paradise rather than in the actual city of Las Vegas.

Paradise was theatrically released October 18, 2013 and received generally negative reviews from critics. It was the last film by Mandate Pictures before it was reorganized as Good Universe.

== Plot ==
Lamb Mannerhelm goes to speak at her family's church in Montana one year after surviving a plane crash, which has left her with severe burns all over her body. She was awarded money after the crash and while everyone is expecting her to make some big announcement, she instead publicly denounces her belief in God, causing a major uproar in the church. Lamb later explains some of the strict rules she has to live by in her conservative town of Blakesley, like listening only to Christian music, and not being allowed to wear pants.

Feeling both angry and inexperienced in life, Lamb heads to Las Vegas to indulge in the sinful pleasures that are objected to in her community as she sees surviving the plane crash as a second chance at life and time for her to now live life on her own terms. Once there, she goes to a random bar in order to have her first drink, where she meets a bartender named William, and a singer named Loray. William is a British man living in Las Vegas while Loray is a part-time film student who sings at the HiLo casino there. Lamb has adventures with Loray and meets gay people in nightclubs as well as tries ziplining.

Lamb, whose skin condition is worsening and bleeding, is comforted by William and Loray but in vain as she takes off in a cab. William and Loray soon find Lamb and she is taken to her hotel by William. Lamb tries to seduce William but he refuses to make love due to bleeding from her shoulder. Lamb does not want to return to Blakesley, Montana and wishes to stay in Vegas. William then explains there are plenty of fish in the sea and that the world is not just Blakesley, Montana or the Vegas Strip. She tries to understand. The next day, Lamb gives William money for Loray to return to school and tries a chocolate orgasm. She then heads to Blakesley and reconciles with her family. William still works at HiLo while Loray finds an internship near her sister's place in Florida.

== Cast ==
- Julianne Hough as Lamb Mannerhelm
- Russell Brand as William
- Octavia Spencer as Loray
- Nick Offerman as Mr. Mannerhelm
- Holly Hunter as Mrs. Mannerhelm
- Iliza Shlesinger as Carol
- Kathleen Rose Perkins as Amber

== Production ==
The film was shot in New Orleans. Cast member Russell Brand was arrested during the shoot for grabbing a photographer's iPhone and throwing it through a window.

== Reception ==
On Rotten Tomatoes, the film holds an approval rating of 20% based on 41 reviews, with an average rating of 4.3/10. The website's critics consensus reads: "Paradise rounds up an impressive array of talent on either side of the camera -- all of whom would presumably prefer that audiences forget their involvement in this misfire." Metacritic gives the film a weighted average score of 35 out of 100, based on 15 critics, indicating "generally unfavorable" reviews.
