= Superbad =

2007 film by Greg Mottola

- Theatrical release poster
- Directed by: Greg Mottola
- Written by: Seth Rogen; Evan Goldberg
- Produced by: Judd Apatow; Shauna Robertson
- Starring: Jonah Hill; Michael Cera; Seth Rogen; Bill Hader
- Cinematography: Russ Alsobrook
- Edited by: William Kerr
- Music by: Lyle Workman
- Production companies: Columbia Pictures; The Apatow Company
- Distributed by: Sony Pictures Releasing
- Release dates: August 13, 2007 (Grauman's Chinese Theatre); August 17, 2007 (United States)
- Running time: 113 minutes
- Country: United States
- Language: English
- Budget: $17.5–20 million
- Box office: $170.8 million

Superbad is a 2007 American buddy comedy film directed by Greg Mottola, written by Seth Rogen and Evan Goldberg, and produced by Judd Apatow. It stars Jonah Hill and Michael Cera as Seth and Evan, two teenagers about to graduate from high school. Before graduating, the boys want to party and lose their virginity, but their plan proves harder than expected. Christopher Mintz-Plasse (in his film debut), Rogen, Bill Hader, Martha MacIsaac, and Emma Stone (in her film debut) provide supporting roles.

Rogen and Goldberg wrote the script during their teenage years. It is loosely based on their experience in Grade 12 at Point Grey Secondary School in Vancouver during the 1990s. The main characters have the same given names as the two writers. Rogen was also initially intended to play Seth, but due to age and physical size this was changed, and Hill went on to portray Seth, while Rogen portrayed the irresponsible Officer Michaels, opposite Saturday Night Live star Hader as Officer Slater.

Superbad premiered at Grauman's Chinese Theatre on August 13, 2007, and was theatrically released in the United States four days later on August 17, 2007. The film received positive reviews, with critics praising the dialogue and the chemistry between the two leads as well as the performances of the supporting cast. The film also proved financially successful, grossing $170.8 million on a $17.5–20 million budget. The film has since become a cult classic.

== Plot ==
Seth and Evan are unpopular Nevada high school seniors who have been best friends since childhood, and hope to lose their virginities before going to different colleges. Jules, a girl Seth is attracted to, invites him to a party at her house. Seth and Evan's friend Fogell has a fake ID, so Seth promises to buy Jules alcohol. Evan runs into Becca, with whom he is infatuated, and offers to get her alcohol as well.

Fogell attempts to buy the alcohol at a liquor store with his fake ID under the mononym "McLovin". His attempt seems to work as the clerk accepts his fake ID and starts to ring up the transaction, but mid-transaction, Fogell is knocked down by a robber before he can purchase the alcohol. When police officers Slater and Michaels arrive, Seth and Evan, who are outside, believe that Fogell is being arrested. While waiting outside the liquor store, Seth is hit by a motorist. In exchange for their not reporting him, the motorist promises to take them to another party where they can get alcohol. Meanwhile, after getting his statement, the officers agree to drive Fogell to the party. Despite being on duty, they start drinking. Bonding with Fogell, they engage in various shenanigans.

At the party, Seth plans to steal alcohol while Evan is hesitant to stay. The motorist is kicked out by the party host and a fight ensues; Evan decides to leave despite Seth's insistence he stay. Seth then dances with a drunk Jacinda, who stains his leg with menstrual blood. Seth is confronted by the party's host for dancing with his fiancée, and a brawl ensues. The police are called, and Seth and Evan reunite outside and escape. Seth chastises Evan for bailing on him, reminding him that they had lifelong plans to attend college together. Evan retorts that Seth is selfish and holds him back. Evan shoves Seth, who is struck by the police cruiser driven by a distracted Slater. The officers plan to blame the crash on Seth and Evan, but as Fogell emerges from the car, all three flee. Reunited, the trio make their way to Jules' party.

At the party, Fogell inadvertently reveals that he and Evan will be living together at college, upsetting Seth. Seth then delivers the alcohol to Jules and begins drinking heavily. Meanwhile, Becca attempts to seduce Evan to take her virginity, but he declines as she is drunk and may regret it. Meanwhile, Fogell impresses classmate Nicola, so she takes him upstairs to have sex. Seth drunkenly attempts to kiss Jules, but she declines because she does not want to kiss him while he is drunk. Believing he has ruined his chance, Seth becomes upset and falls down in a drunken stupor, accidentally headbutting Jules and giving her a black eye.

Slater and Michaels bust the party. Seth wakes up and escapes, carrying an intoxicated Evan away from the house. Slater busts in on Fogell and Nicola, causing her to run off. Slater and Michaels reveal they knew all along that Fogell was underage but played along, wanting to show him that cops can have fun too. To make it up to him, they make a fake spectacle of perp-walking him to their cruiser in front of his classmates. They then destroy the damaged police cruiser together.

Seth sleeps over at Evan's, where he reveals he discovered weeks earlier that Evan and Fogell planned to live together at college. They apologize to each other and reconcile. The next day, Seth and Evan visit the mall and run into Jules and Becca. Becca and Seth apologize for their drunken behavior, and the boys head their separate ways with their respective love interests.

== Cast ==
- Jonah Hill as Seth, Evan's best friend who is anxious to have sex and is romantically interested in Jules
  - Casey Margolis as young Seth
- Michael Cera as Evan, Seth's best friend who is hesitant with Seth's plan to obtain alcohol and have sex; he is romantically interested in Becca
- Christopher Mintz-Plasse as Fogell / McLovin, Seth and Evan's friend who obtains a fake ID and attempts to use it
- Bill Hader as Officer Slater, a cop who befriends Fogell
- Seth Rogen as Officer Michaels, a cop who befriends Fogell
- Kevin Corrigan as Mark
- Joe Lo Truglio as Francis
- Martha MacIsaac as Becca, Evan's friend and love interest
  - Laura Marano as young Becca
- Emma Stone as Jules, Seth's friend and love interest who asks Seth to buy alcohol for her party
- Aviva Baumann as Nicola
- Dave Franco as Greg
- Laura Seay as Shirley
- Roger Iwami as Miroki
- Marcella Lentz-Pope as Gaby
- Stacy Edwards as Jane
- David Krumholtz as Benji Austin
- Martin Starr as James Masslin
- Ben Best as Quince Danbury
- Lauren Miller as Scarlett Brighton
- Brooke Dillman as Mrs. Hayworth
- Joe Nunez as Liquor Store Clerk
- Steve Bannos as Math Teacher
- Carla Gallo as Jacinda
- Clark Duke as a Party Teenager
- Danny McBride (uncredited) as Buddy at Party
- Cortney Palm (uncredited) as Partygoer
- Clement Blake as Homeless Guy
- Erica Vittina Phillips as Mindy

== Production ==
=== Development ===
Superbad was written by Evan Goldberg and Seth Rogen during their teen years. They began writing the movie at age 13. It is loosely based on their own experience as seniors in Vancouver in the late 1990s, hence the character names Seth and Evan. Other characters and references were influenced by Goldberg and Rogen's adolescence, such as Steven Glanzberg, their peer at Point Grey Secondary School, characterized in the film as a loner. According to an interview at an event panel in 2009, Fogell was also a real friend of Rogen and Goldberg. Rogen was initially slated to play Jonah Hill's character Seth. Still, due to his physical size and age, he played one of the police officers. When asked where he wants to be dropped off, Fogell tells the officers to take him to 13th and Granville, a nod to Rogen and Goldberg's favorite all-you-can-eat sushi restaurant in Vancouver. Superbad took seven years to complete from early scripting in 2000 and filming from 2006 to 2007. Among the films that served as inspiration for Superbad were Dazed and Confused, Fast Times at Ridgemont High, and American Graffiti.

=== Filming ===
The film was primarily shot in Los Angeles in the fall of 2006. Exterior shots of the high school were filmed at El Segundo High School. The mall scenes were shot at the Fox Hills Mall in Culver City, California.

Other filming locations include the convenience store at the beginning of the film, also in Culver City, the liquor store where "McLovin" gets IDed in Glendale, California, and the bar where the cops take McLovin for a drink is neighboring Los Angeles International Airport (LAX). The scene where McLovin and the cops do donuts in the cop car was filmed in a parking lot on the California State University, Northridge campus.

Christopher Mintz-Plasse was 17 at the time of filming Superbad, and as a result, his mother was required to be present on set during the filming of his sex scene.

== Reception ==
=== Box office ===
Seth Rogen and Evan Goldberg at a Superbad panel at San Diego Comic-Con in July 2007

Superbad opened at number one at the United States box office, grossing US$33,052,411 in its opening weekend from 2,948 theaters for an average of US$11,212 per theater. The film stayed at #1 the second week, grossing US$18,044,369.

The film grossed US$121.5 million in the United States and Canada and US$48.4 million in other countries, for a total of US$169.9 million worldwide. Compared to the budget of $17.5–20 million, the film earned a huge financial profit, making it the highest domestic grossing high school comedy at the time (it was surpassed by 21 Jump Street, a film also starring Hill, in 2012).

=== Critical response ===
On Rotten Tomatoes, the film has an approval rating of 88% based on reviews from 206 critics, with an average rating of 7.70/10. The website's summary reads: "Deftly balancing vulgarity and sincerity while placing its protagonists in excessive situations, Superbad is an authentic take on friendship and the overarching awkwardness of the high school experience." On Metacritic, the film has a score of 76/100 based on 36 reviews, indicating "generally favorable reviews". Audiences surveyed by CinemaScore gave the film a grade A− on scale of A to F.

Mick LaSalle of the San Francisco Chronicle called it 2007's most successful comedy. Roger Ebert of the Chicago Sun-Times had the headline of his review read "McLovin It", and gave the film 3 1/2 out of 4 stars, and said: "The movie reminded me a little of National Lampoon's Animal House, except that it's more mature, as all movies are." Carina Chocano of the Los Angeles Times said: "Physically, Hill and Cera recall the classic comic duos—Laurel and Hardy, Abbott and Costello, Aykroyd and Belushi. But they are contemporary kids, sophisticated and sensitive to nuance"; she added: "I hope it's not damning the movie with the wrong kind of praise to say that for a film so deliriously smutty, Superbad is supercute." Sean Burns of Philadelphia Weekly said "2007: the year Judd Apatow and Seth Rogen saved movie comedy", a reference to Knocked Up which was released in June. Devin Gordon of Newsweek said: "As a Revenge of the Nerds redux, Superbad isn't perfect. But it's super close."

In a more critical vein, Stephen Farber of The Hollywood Reporter, compared the film to other films with a single-day structure, such as American Graffiti and Dazed and Confused, but said that Superbad "doesn't have the smarts or the depths of those ensemble comedies." The Hollywood Reporter review was referenced in the film's DVD audio commentary, particularly the review's suggestion that the two main characters have a homoerotic experience similar to the film Y Tu Mamá También. Roger Moore of the Orlando Sentinel called the film a "super-derivative, super-raunchy sack of laughs" and a "great vulgarian send-off to the summer of Knocked Up" that plays like "Freaks and Geeks: Uncensored." Moore concluded, "The energy flags as it overstays its welcome. The Apatow Rule, 'If it gets a laugh, don't cut it,' doesn't do movies under his banner any favors. Still, there are plenty of those laughs, from the ruder-than-rude opening to the ironic-sentimental ending." Wesley Morris of The Boston Globe said the film "has a degree more sophistication than Revenge of the Nerds and American Pie, and less than the underrated House Party." Morris also said, "the few smart observations could have come from an episode of one of Apatow's TV shows" and "I wanted to find this as funny as audiences did."

=== Accolades ===
The film was listed as #487 on Empire's 500 Greatest films of all time. In 2025, it ranked number 100 on The New York Times' list of "The 100 Best Movies of the 21st Century" and number 53 on the "Readers' Choice" edition of the list.

The film's screenplay was also named the 88th greatest of the 21st century by the Writers Guild of America (WGA). The WGA also named the script the 68th funniest ever written on their list of the "101 Funniest Screenplays".

Year	Award	Category	Nominee	Result	Ref.
2007	Austin Film Critics Association Awards	Breakthrough Artist	Michael Cera	Won	
2007	Broadcast Film Critics Association Awards	Best Comedy Movie	Superbad	Nominated	
2007	Broadcast Film Critics Association Awards	Best Young Actor	Michael Cera	Nominated	
2007	Chicago Film Critics Association Awards	Most Promising Performer	Michael Cera	Won	
2007	Empire Awards	Best Comedy	Superbad	Nominated	
2007	Teen Choice Awards	Choice Summer Movie – Comedy/Musical	Superbad	Nominated	
2008	Canadian Comedy Awards	Best Writing	Seth Rogen	Won	
2008	Canadian Comedy Awards	Best Male Performance	Michael Cera	Won	
2008	MTV Movie Awards	Best Comedic Performance	Jonah Hill	Nominated	
2008	MTV Movie Awards	Best Movie	Superbad	Nominated	
2008	MTV Movie Awards	Breakthrough Performance	Michael Cera	Nominated	
2008	MTV Movie Awards	Breakthrough Performance	Jonah Hill	Nominated	
2008	MTV Movie Awards	Breakthrough Performance	Christopher Mintz-Plasse	Nominated	
2008	Peabody Awards	Best New Comedy Performance	Superbad	Nominated	
2008	Young Hollywood Awards	Exciting New Face	Emma Stone	Won	

== Home media ==
Superbad was released on DVD, UMD and Blu-ray on December 4, 2007, by Sony Pictures Home Entertainment. The special edition DVD sparked controversy in Hawaii due to the inclusion of a replica of the fake McLovin ID used in the film, which heavily resembled the state's real-life driver's license. This resulted in Walmart removing it from the shelves in the state.

== Legacy ==
Since its release, it has retrospectively garnered acclaim as one of the best comedies of the 2000s and as one of the best high school films of all time. It has been hailed as one of the defining films of the Millennial generation.

== Books ==
Two tie-in books to the film were published by Newmarket Press:

- Superbad: The Illustrated Moviebook (ISBN 9781557047984) was published on December 4, 2007, to coincide with the release of the film on DVD. This official companion book includes an introduction by producer Judd Apatow; the complete script by Seth Rogen and Evan Goldberg; commentaries by Apatow, Rogen and Goldberg, and journalists from Rolling Stone, The New York Times, and Entertainment Weekly; 56 film stills; "Mr. Vagtastic Guide to Buying Porn;" and 24 "phallographic" drawings by David Goldberg that viewers will recognize from the film's end credits.
- Superbad: The Drawings (ISBN 9781557048080) was published on February 14, 2008. This gift hardcover art book contains 82 "phallographic" drawings created by David Goldberg (Evan Goldberg's brother) for the film.

== Soundtrack ==
The soundtrack album was released by Lakeshore Records on August 7, 2007. It combines Lyle Workman's original, funk-influenced score with songs by artists including the Bar-Kays, Jean Knight, Curtis Mayfield, the Roots, Rick James, and Sérgio Mendes & Brasil '66'. Workman recruited Bootsy Collins, Phelps "Catfish" Collins, Clyde Stubblefield, John "Jabo" Starks, and Bernie Worrell—musicians associated with James Brown's backing band, the J.B.'s. Workman said that an early cut of the film had been temp-tracked with 1970s funk and soul music, which helped establish the musical direction of the score.The 18-track album has a running time of 52 minutes and 46 seconds.
