= Young Adult (film) =

2011 film by Jason Reitman

- Theatrical release poster
- Directed by: Jason Reitman
- Written by: Diablo Cody
- Produced by: Lianne Halfon; Russell Smith; Diablo Cody; Mason Novick; Jason Reitman
- Starring: Charlize Theron; Patton Oswalt; Patrick Wilson; Elizabeth Reaser
- Cinematography: Eric Steelberg
- Edited by: Dana E. Glauberman
- Music by: Rolfe Kent
- Production companies: Mandate Pictures; Mr. Mudd; Right of Way Films; Denver and Delilah Films
- Distributed by: Paramount Pictures
- Release date: December 9, 2011
- Running time: 94 minutes
- Country: United States
- Language: English
- Budget: $12 million
- Box office: $22.9 million

Young Adult is a 2011 American comedy-drama film directed by Jason Reitman, written by Diablo Cody, and starring Charlize Theron. Reitman and Cody worked together previously on Juno (2007). Young Adult began a limited release on December 9, 2011, before expanding to a wide release on December 16, 2011. It received generally positive reviews from critics, and Theron earned a Golden Globe nomination for her performance.

== Plot ==
Mavis Gary is a 37-year-old divorced, alcoholic ghost writer of a series of young adult novels, on deadline with her editor to finish the last book of the soon-to-be-canceled series. Mavis receives an e-mail with a picture of the newborn daughter of her high school boyfriend Buddy Slade and his wife Beth. Believing it to be a sign she and Buddy are meant to be together, Mavis leaves Minneapolis, returning to her hometown of Mercury, Minnesota, to reclaim her life with him, under the pretext of overseeing a real estate deal.

Arriving after listening to "The Concept" by Teenage Fanclub from an old mixtape Buddy gave her in high school, Mavis arranges to meet him the next day at a local sports bar for old times' sake. Beforehand, she goes alone to the bar Woody's. There she reconnects with a former classmate she barely remembers, Matt Freehauf, who became disabled and disfigured after being beaten by jocks—Mavis' boyfriends—who assumed he was gay. He tells her that her plan to reclaim Buddy is irrational and selfish, but she ignores him.

The following day, Mavis meets Buddy at the sports bar, where they see Matt again, as he is the bar's bookkeeper. On their way out, Buddy invites her to a performance of Beth's "mom rock band". Mavis spends another night getting drunk with Matt, who distills homemade bourbon in his garage where he lives with his sister Sandra.

On another outing with Matt, Mavis also runs into a handicapped cousin who lives locally. When she attends the gig, the other moms are resentful of Mavis, whom they remember as the "psychotic prom queen bitch". As Beth's band performs, the lead singer dedicates their opening song to Buddy from Beth; "The Concept". Angry, Mavis tries to get Buddy's attention on her, but she comes off as cringey.

Beth wants to stay out longer, so Mavis offers to drive the drunk Buddy home. On the lawn, they share a kiss that is quickly broken up when the babysitter opens the front door to greet them. The next day, after an awkward encounter with her parents, who didn't know she was in town, Mavis is invited to Buddy's daughter's naming ceremony. She later brings Matt to their old high school to get drunk again, and he tells her to grow up.

The following day, Mavis attends the party, where she declares her love for Buddy, but he rebuffs her. Everyone at the party is called out to the lawn to await a surprise he has prepared for Beth. A drunk Mavis collides with Beth, who accidentally spills punch on Mavis's dress. She insults her and, in a profanity-laced tirade, tearfully reveals that she became pregnant with Buddy's baby years ago but had a miscarriage at three months.

Buddy, who has been preparing a drum-set gift for Beth in the garage, opens the garage door and belatedly learns what has transpired. Mavis asks him why he invited her. He reveals it was Beth's idea, as she feels sorry for Mavis thinking she is suffering from a mental illness and loneliness. Humiliated, Mavis leaves and visits Matt, where she breaks down in tears and, later, initiates sex.

The following morning, while Matt sleeps, Mavis has coffee in the kitchen with Sandra, who still idolizes her. Mavis talks about needing to change herself, but Sandra says she is better than the rest of Mercury and should not change. Mavis says she agrees and prepares to return to Minneapolis. Sandra asks to go with her but Mavis declines and leaves alone.

In a diner on her way home, Mavis writes the ending of the book, in which the main character graduates high school, quickly leaves her past behind, and looks forward to the future. Afterward, in the parking lot, she glances at the crumpled bumper of her car, before driving off.

== Cast ==
- Charlize Theron as Mavis Gary
- Patton Oswalt as Matt Freehauf
- Patrick Wilson as Buddy Slade
- Elizabeth Reaser as Beth Slade
- Collette Wolfe as Sandra Freehauf
- Jill Eikenberry as Hedda Gary
- Mary Beth Hurt as Jan
- Louisa Krause as Front Desk Girl
- Hettienne Park as Vicki Robek
- J. K. Simmons as Jim, Mavis's Boss (voice only)

== Production ==
=== Pre-production ===
Screenwriter Diablo Cody said the genesis of the film came from her encounters with the press:

This common question I would get at Q&As or press junkets or what-have-you was: "Why are you so fixated on [movies about] adolescents?" [I began wondering:] Am I stunted somehow? And so as I thought about my own life, I thought, "Gosh, that would be a great character—a woman in her 30s who writes young-adult fiction and does in fact cling to deluded teenage fantasies in her real life, and is obsessed with recreating her teenage years come hell or high water."

Writing a spec script, she sent drafts to her friend and Juno director, Jason Reitman, to critique. When the production of Labor Day, a film Reitman had been preparing, was pushed to 2012, a window developed during which he could direct Cody's script.

=== Filming ===
The film was shot on a $12 million budget in 30 days. The movie's location shooting was in Minnesota, while the bulk of the movie, set in the fictional town of Mercury, was shot north of New York City in the towns of White Plains, Nanuet, New City, Tappan, Ardsley, and Port Chester, and in the Long Island towns of Garden City and Massapequa Park, the last of which included Woody's Village Saloon. A few days were also shot on a soundstage at JC Studios in Brooklyn.

Following Charlize Theron and Patrick Wilson's casting, Patton Oswalt was signed after doing a table read-through of the script at Reitman's house. Oswalt said that because his character, Matt Freehauf, had been badly beaten as a teen and was required to walk with a brace, he consulted both an acting coach and a physical therapist to prepare for the role: "I just wanted less and less to have to think about so I could be more present in the scenes with Charlize. She's a really instinctual actor and I really didn't want to be sitting there with eight other thoughts in my head while she's just rolling with it."

== Release ==
Young Adult was given a limited theatrical release on December 9, 2011, before expanding to a wider release on December 16, 2011. It grossed a total of $22.9 million worldwide from a budget of $12 million.

The film was screened out of competition at the 62nd Berlin International Film Festival in February 2012.

== Reception ==
=== Critical response ===
On review aggregator website Rotten Tomatoes, the film holds an approval rating of 80% based on 196 reviews, with an average rating of 7/10. The website's critical consensus reads, "Despite its somewhat dour approach, Young Adult is a funny and ultimately radical no-holds-barred examination of prolonged adolescence, thanks largely to a convincing performance by Charlize Theron." On Metacritic, the film has a weighted average score of 71 out of 100, based on 42 critics, indicating "generally favorable" reviews.

Roger Ebert of the Chicago Sun-Times gave the film three-and-a-half stars out of four, writing, "After I left the screening of Young Adult, my thoughts were mixed. With Thank You for Smoking, Juno, and Up in the Air, Jason Reitman has an incredible track record. Those films were all so rewarding. The character of Mavis makes Young Adult tricky to process. As I absorbed it, I realized what a fearless character study it is. That sometimes it's funny doesn't hurt." Kyle Buchanan of Vulture called Mavis "a woman that dares the audience to dislike her", but David Haglund of Slate stated that she is "mentally ill" and "suffers from depression, alcoholism, and trichotillomania (compulsive hair pulling)".

Tom Long of The Detroit News wrote, "Young Adult may be the year's most engaging feel-bad movie". A. O. Scott of The New York Times praised the film, writing, "Shorter than a bad blind date and as sour as a vinegar Popsicle, Young Adult shrouds its brilliant, brave and breathtakingly cynical heart in the superficial blandness of commercial comedy." Peter Travers of Rolling Stone gave the film three stars out of four, saying, "In this tale of stunted development, Theron is a comic force of nature, giving her character considerable density and humanity despite her monstrous aspects. And Patton Oswalt deserves cheers as Matt, a former classmate who pops Mavis's delusions with soul-crushing honesty. His dark duet with Theron is funny, touching and vital. But fair warning: The laughs in Young Adult leave bruises." Richard Roeper awarded the film an A grade, stating "Charlize Theron delivers one of the most impressive performances of the year".

The film appeared on many critics' lists of the best films of 2011.

=== Year-end lists ===
- 5th – Nathan Rabin, The A.V. Club
- 8th – Kate Erbland, Boxoffice
- Unranked – Amy Nicholson, Boxoffice
- 7th – Drew McWeeny, HitFix
- 10th – Betsy Sharkey, Los Angeles Times
- Unranked – A.O. Scott, The New York Times
- 8th – Susan G. Cole, Now
- 10th – Glenn Sumi, Now
- 6th – Mike Russell, The Oregonian
- 4th – Angie Han, /Film
- 8th – Steve Persall, St. Petersburg Times
- 7th – Mary Pols, Time
- Unranked – Joe Morgenstern, Wall Street Journal

=== Awards and nominations ===
| Award | Date of ceremony | Category | Nominee(s) | Result | Ref. |
|---|---|---|---|---|---|
| American Cinema Editors | February 18, 2012 | Best Edited Feature Film – Comedy or Musical | Dana E. Glauberman | Nominated | |
| Chicago Film Critics Association | December 19, 2011 | Best Supporting Actor | Patton Oswalt | Nominated | |
| Critics' Choice Movie Awards | January 12, 2012 | Best Actress | Charlize Theron | Nominated | |
| Critics' Choice Movie Awards | January 12, 2012 | Best Original Screenplay | Diablo Cody | Nominated | |
| Critics' Choice Movie Awards | January 12, 2012 | Best Supporting Actor | Patton Oswalt | Nominated | |
| Dallas-Fort Worth Film Critics Association Awards | December 16, 2011 | Best Actress | Charlize Theron | Nominated | |
| Golden Globe Awards | January 15, 2012 | Best Actress – Motion Picture Musical or Comedy | Charlize Theron | Nominated | |
| Hollywood Film Awards | October 24, 2011 | Screenwriter of the Year | Diablo Cody | Won | |
| Los Angeles Film Critics Association Awards | December 11, 2011 | Best Supporting Actor | Patton Oswalt | 2nd place | |
| National Society of Film Critics Awards | January 7, 2012 | Best Supporting Actor | Patton Oswalt | 3rd place | |
| Palm Springs International Film Festival | January 7, 2012 | Chairman's Vanguard Award | Jason Reitman (director); Diablo Cody (writer); Charlize Theron (actress); Patton Oswalt (actor) | Won | |
| Santa Barbara International Film Festival | February 3, 2012 | Virtuoso Award | Patton Oswalt | Won | |
| Satellite Awards | December 18, 2011 | Best Actress - Motion Picture | Charlize Theron | Nominated | |
| Toronto Film Critics Association Awards | December 14, 2011 | Best Supporting Actor | Patton Oswalt | Nominated | |
| Writers Guild of America Awards | February 19, 2012 | Best Original Screenplay | Diablo Cody | Nominated | |
