= Mason Novick =

American film producer

- Born: December 20, 1974; Chicago, Illinois, U.S.
- Occupation(s): Film producer Talent manager

Mason Novick (born December 20, 1974) is an American film producer and talent manager based in Los Angeles.

== Career ==
His credits include Red Eye (2005), Juno (2007), (500) Days of Summer (2009) and Jennifer's Body (2009). He has also acted in small roles in his films, including parts in Red Eye and The Hollow.

He most recently was a producer on the Focus Features film Lisa Frankenstein.

== Professional relationship with Diablo Cody ==
Novick has taken part in several projects with screenwriter Diablo Cody, including Jennifer's Body, and Juno, for which he was nominated for the Academy Award for Best Picture in 2008, and won a Christopher Award and an Independent Spirit Award.

Novick claims to have found Diablo Cody by reading Cody's blog while she was a blogger living in Minneapolis. He found "her voice [to be] so interesting and so fresh". Inspired by her writing, he rang Cody and asked her whether she had ever considered writing a book or a screenplay. As a result of Novick's encouragement, Cody wrote the script which would become Juno.

Novick has worked with Cody on Young Adult (2011), Paradise (2013), and Tully.

== Partial filmography ==
He was a producer in all films unless otherwise noted.

=== Film ===
Year	Film	Credit	Notes	Ref.
2005	Red Eye	Executive producer		
2007	Solstice	Co-executive producer		
2007	Juno			
2008	Insanitarium	Executive producer	Direct-to-video	
2009	500 Days of Summer			
2009	Jennifer's Body			
2011	Young Adult			
2013	The Incredible Burt Wonderstone	Co-producer		
2013	Paradise			
2013	Bad Words			
2014	Men, Women & Children	Executive producer		
2015	Ricki and the Flash			
2015	Hidden			
2016	ARQ			
2017	Newness	Executive producer		
2018	Tully			
2018	When We First Met			
2018	Social Animals	Executive producer		
2019	Big Time Adolescence			
2019	Buffaloed			
2020	Desperados			
2020	The Broken Hearts Gallery	Executive producer		
2021	We Broke Up			
2021	Dating and New York	Executive producer		
2021	Nightbooks			
2022	Watcher			
2024	Lisa Frankenstein	Producer		
2024	I Love You Forever	Producer		
2024	Young Werther	Executive producer		
TBA	Ursa Major	Producer		

As an actor

Year	Film	Role	Notes
2005	Red Eye	Flight Passenger	Uncredited

Thanks

Year	Film	Role
1999	Man of the Century	Thanks
2007	Rattle Basket	Special thanks
2015	The Diabolical	Thank you: From the director and writers

=== Television ===
Year	Title	Credit	Notes
2004	The Hollow		Television film
2018	Liberty Crossing	Executive producer	

As an actor

Year	Title	Role	Notes
2004	The Hollow	Evil Skeleton	Television film

== Recognition ==
In 2008, Novick won both a Christopher Award and an Independent Spirit Award for Best Film for Juno. He was nominated for the Producers Guild of America and Academy Award for Best Picture also for Juno.

=== Awards and nominations ===
- 2010, Nominated for Independent Spirit Award
- 2008, Won, Independent Spirit Award
- 2008, Won, Christopher Award
- 2007, Nominated for Academy Award for Best Motion Picture
- 2007, Nominated for PGA Awards for Motion Picture Producer of the Year Award
