= Chicago Film Critics Association Awards 2007 =

Annual US film awards ceremony

20th CFCA Awards

December 13, 2007

Best Film:
No Country for Old Men

The 20th Chicago Film Critics Association Awards, given by the CFCA on December 13, 2007, honored the best in film for 2007.

== Winners and nominees ==
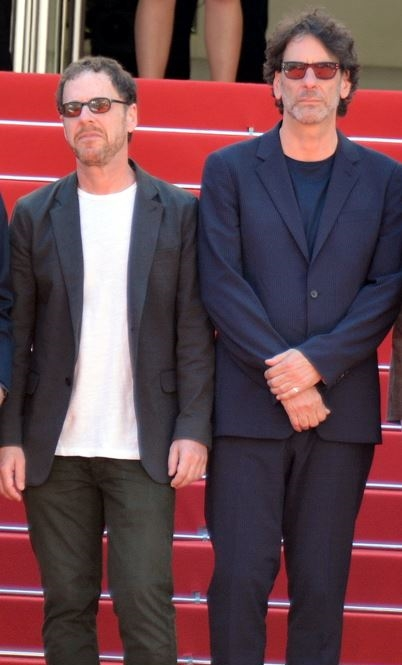
Coen brothers, Best Director and Best Adapted Screenplay winners

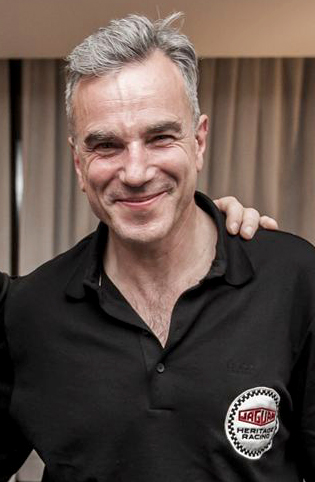
Daniel Day-Lewis, Best Actor winner

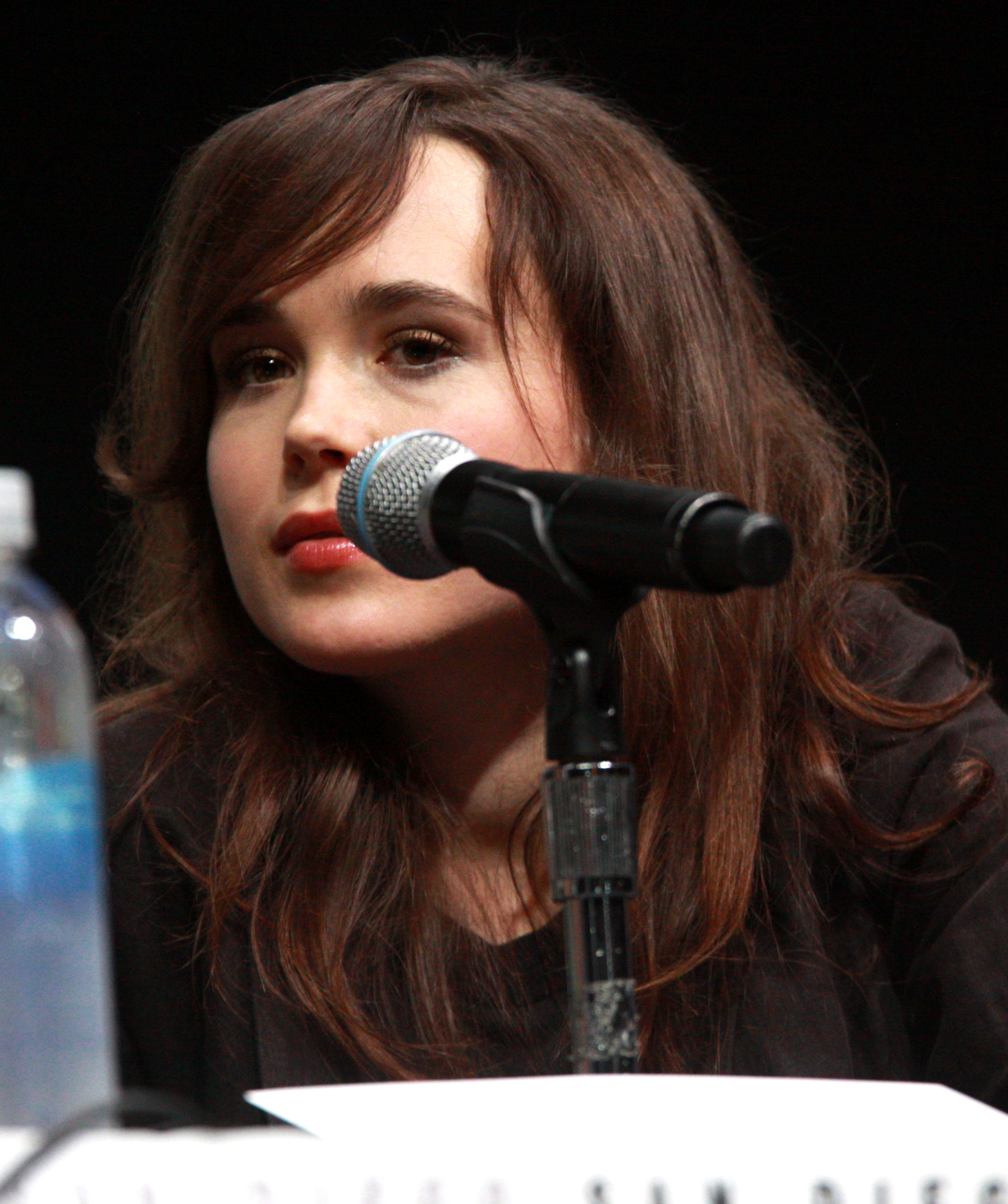
Elliot Page, Best Actress winner

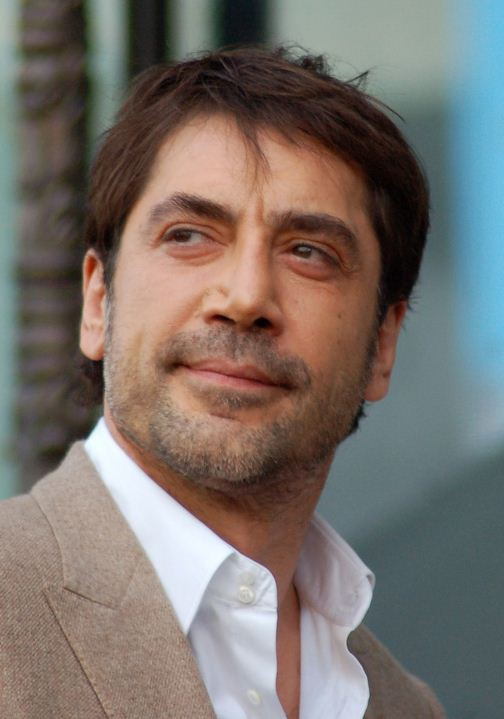
Javier Bardem, Best Supporting Actor winner

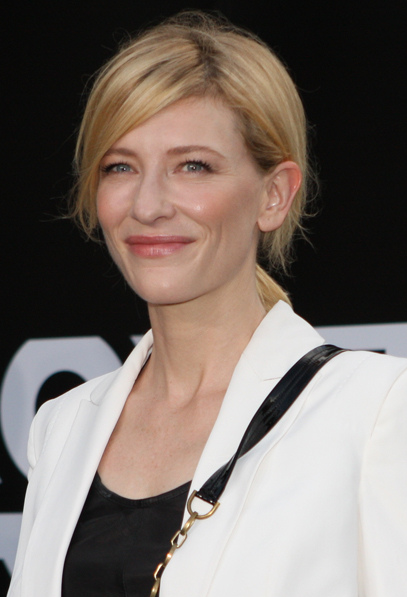
Cate Blanchett, Best Supporting Actress winner

=== Best Actor ===
Daniel Day-Lewis – There Will Be Blood

- George Clooney – Michael Clayton
- Ryan Gosling – Lars and the Real Girl
- Frank Langella – Starting Out in the Evening
- Viggo Mortensen – Eastern Promises

=== Best Actress ===
Elliot Page (Note: Credited as Ellen Page) – Juno

- Julie Christie – Away from Her
- Marion Cotillard – La Vie en Rose (La môme)
- Angelina Jolie – A Mighty Heart
- Laura Linney – The Savages

=== Best Animated Feature ===
Ratatouille

- Beowulf
- Meet the Robinsons
- Persepolis
- The Simpsons Movie

=== Best Cinematography ===
The Assassination of Jesse James by the Coward Robert Ford – Roger Deakins

- No Country for Old Men – Roger Deakins
- Atonement – Seamus McGarvey
- The Diving Bell and the Butterfly (Le scaphandre et le papillon) – Janusz Kamiński
- There Will Be Blood – Robert Elswit

=== Best Director ===
Joel Coen and Ethan Coen – No Country for Old Men

- Paul Thomas Anderson – There Will Be Blood
- David Fincher – Zodiac
- Tony Gilroy – Michael Clayton
- Jason Reitman – Juno

=== Best Documentary Feature ===
Sicko

- Darfur Now
- The King of Kong: A Fistful of Quarters
- Lake of Fire
- No End in Sight

=== Best Film ===
No Country for Old Men

- Into the Wild
- Michael Clayton
- Once
- There Will Be Blood

=== Best Foreign Language Film ===
4 Months, 3 Weeks and 2 Days (4 luni, 3 saptamani si 2 zile), Romania

- Black Book (Zwartboek), Netherlands
- The Diving Bell and the Butterfly (Le scaphandre et le papillon), France
- Lust, Caution (Se, jie), China/Taiwan
- The Orphanage (El orfanato), Spain
- La Vie en Rose (La môme), France

=== Best Original Score ===
Once – Glen Hansard and Markéta Irglová

- The Assassination of Jesse James by the Coward Robert Ford – Nick Cave and Warren Ellis
- Atonement – Dario Marianelli
- Lust, Caution (Se, jie) – Alexandre Desplat
- There Will Be Blood – Jonny Greenwood

=== Best Screenplay – Adapted ===
No Country for Old Men – Joel Coen and Ethan Coen

- Atonement – Christopher Hampton
- Into the Wild – Sean Penn
- There Will Be Blood – Paul Thomas Anderson
- Zodiac – James Vanderbilt

=== Best Screenplay – Original ===
Juno – Diablo Cody

- Before the Devil Knows You're Dead – Kelly Masterson
- Michael Clayton – Tony Gilroy
- Ratatouille – Brad Bird
- The Savages – Tamara Jenkins

=== Best Supporting Actor ===
Javier Bardem – No Country for Old Men

- Casey Affleck – The Assassination of Jesse James by the Coward Robert Ford
- Philip Seymour Hoffman – Charlie Wilson's War
- Hal Holbrook – Into the Wild
- Tom Wilkinson – Michael Clayton

=== Best Supporting Actress ===
Cate Blanchett – I'm Not There

- Jennifer Jason Leigh – Margot at the Wedding
- Leslie Mann – Knocked Up
- Amy Ryan – Gone Baby Gone
- Tilda Swinton – Michael Clayton

=== Most Promising Director ===
Ben Affleck – Gone Baby Gone

- John Carney – Once
- Craig Gillespie – Lars and the Real Girl
- Tony Gilroy – Michael Clayton
- Sarah Polley – Away from Her

=== Most Promising Performer ===
Michael Cera – Juno and Superbad

- Nikki Blonsky – Hairspray
- Glen Hansard – Once
- Carice van Houten – Black Book
- Tang Wei – Lust, Caution
