= 2008 MTV Movie Awards =

American film awards ceremony

- Date: Sunday, June 1, 2008
- Location: Gibson Amphitheatre, Universal City, California
- Country: United States
- Hosted by: Mike Myers

Television/radio coverage
- Network: MTV
- Produced by: Mark Burnett
- Directed by: Joe DeMaio

The 2008 MTV Movie Awards was the 17th annual movie awards show and was broadcast live on Sunday, June 1, at the Gibson Amphitheatre in Universal City, California. The ceremonies were hosted by Mike Myers. A new category, "Best Summer Movie So Far" – debuted at the annual awards ceremony.

== Performers ==
- Coldplay — "Viva la Vida"
- The Pussycat Dolls — "When I Grow Up"
- Adam Sandler - "Nobody Does It Better" (with part of the guitar solo from Pink Floyd's "Mother"). (Honoring his MTV Generation Award, with modified lyrics. This version can also be found on the 2016 digital compilation Cover Bond: Great Music Artists Performing The Songs from Every James Bond Movie.)

== Presenters ==
- Will Smith, Charlize Theron, and Jason Bateman — presented Best Female Performance
- Will Ferrell and Danny McBride — presented Best Fight
- Edward Norton and Liv Tyler — introduced Coldplay
- Seth Rogen and James Franco — presented Best Summer Movie so Far
- Jennifer Hudson and Sarah Jessica Parker — presented Best Male Performance
- Steve Carell, Dwayne Johnson, and Anne Hathaway — presented Best Comedic Performance
- Tom Cruise — presented the MTV Generation Award, introduced Adam Sandler
- P. Diddy, Lindsay Lohan, and Verne Troyer — presented Breakthrough Performance
- Brendan Fraser — presented Best Villain
- Katharine McPhee, Anna Faris, Rumer Willis and Emma Stone — introduced the Pussycat Dolls
- Megan Fox and Rainn Wilson — presented Best Kiss
- Ben Stiller, Jack Black, and Robert Downey Jr. — presented Best Movie

== Awards ==
Below are the list of nominations. Winners are listed first and highlighted in bold.

Best Movie
**Transformers**; Superbad; Juno; National Treasure: Book of Secrets; Pirates of the Caribbean: At World's End; I Am Legend
Best Male Performance	Best Female Performance
**Will Smith – I Am Legend**; Michael Cera – Juno; Matt Damon – The Bourne Ultimatum; Shia LaBeouf – Transformers; Denzel Washington – American Gangster	**Elliot Page (Note: Credited as Ellen Page) – Juno**; Amy Adams – Enchanted; Jessica Biel – I Now Pronounce You Chuck and Larry; Katherine Heigl – Knocked Up; Keira Knightley – Pirates of the Caribbean: At World's End
Breakthrough Performance	Best Villain
**Zac Efron – Hairspray**; Nikki Blonsky – Hairspray; Megan Fox – Transformers; Chris Brown – This Christmas; Michael Cera – Superbad; Jonah Hill – Superbad; Christopher Mintz-Plasse – Superbad; Seth Rogen – Knocked Up	**Johnny Depp – Sweeney Todd: The Demon Barber of Fleet Street**; Topher Grace – Spider-Man 3; Javier Bardem – No Country for Old Men; Angelina Jolie – Beowulf; Denzel Washington – American Gangster
Best Comedic Performance	Best Kiss
**Johnny Depp – Pirates of the Caribbean: At World's End**; Amy Adams – Enchanted; Jonah Hill – Superbad; Seth Rogen – Knocked Up; Adam Sandler – I Now Pronounce You Chuck and Larry	**Robert Hoffman and Briana Evigan – Step Up 2: The Streets**; Amy Adams and Patrick Dempsey – Enchanted; Shia LaBeouf and Sarah Roemer – Disturbia; Elliot Page and Michael Cera – Juno; Daniel Radcliffe and Katie Leung – Harry Potter and the Order of the Phoenix
Best Fight	Best Summer Movie So Far
**Sean Faris vs. Cam Gigandet – Never Back Down**; Alien vs. Predator – Aliens vs. Predator: Requiem; Hayden Christensen vs. Jamie Bell – Jumper; Matt Damon vs. Joey Ansah – The Bourne Ultimatum; Tobey Maguire vs. James Franco – Spider-Man 3; Chris Tucker and Jackie Chan vs. Sun Mingming – Rush Hour 3	**Iron Man**; Indiana Jones and the Kingdom of the Crystal Skull; The Chronicles of Narnia: Prince Caspian; Sex and the City; Speed Racer

=== MTV Generation Award ===
- **Adam Sandler**
