= Florida Film Critics Circle Awards 2007 =

Annual US film awards ceremony

12th FFCC Awards

December 12, 2007

Best Film:
No Country for Old Men

The 12th Florida Film Critics Circle Awards, given by the Florida Film Critics Circle on December 12, 2007, honored the best in film for 2007.

== Winners ==
- Best Actor:
  - Daniel Day-Lewis - There Will Be Blood
- Best Actress:
  - Elliot Page (Note: Credited as Ellen Page; Juno was released before Page came out as transgender.) - Juno
- Best Animated Film:
  - Ratatouille
- Best Cinematography:
  - The Assassination of Jesse James by the Coward Robert Ford and No Country for Old Men - Roger Deakins
- Best Director:
  - Ethan and Joel Coen - No Country for Old Men
- Best Documentary Film:
  - No End in Sight
- Best Film:
  - No Country for Old Men
- Best Foreign Language Film:
  - The Diving Bell and the Butterfly (Le scaphandre et le papillon) • France/USA
- Best Original Songs:
  - Glen Hansard and Markéta Irglová - Once
- Best Screenplay:
  - Juno - Diablo Cody
- Best Supporting Actor:
  - Javier Bardem - No Country for Old Men
- Best Supporting Actress:
  - Amy Ryan - Gone Baby Gone
- Pauline Kael Breakout Award:
  - Elliot Page - Juno
