= National Board of Review Awards 2007 =

Annual US film awards ceremony

79th NBR Awards

January 15, 2008

Best Film:
No Country for Old Men

The 79th National Board of Review Awards, honoring the best in film for 2007, were given on 15 January 2008.

== Top 10 Films ==
No Country for Old Men

- The Assassination of Jesse James by the Coward Robert Ford
- Atonement
- The Bourne Ultimatum
- The Bucket List
- Into the Wild
- Juno
- The Kite Runner
- Lars and the Real Girl
- Michael Clayton
- Sweeney Todd: The Demon Barber of Fleet Street

== Winners ==
Best Film:

- No Country for Old Men

Best Director:

- Tim Burton – Sweeney Todd: The Demon Barber of Fleet Street

Best Actor:

- George Clooney – Michael Clayton

Best Actress:

- Julie Christie – Away from Her

Best Supporting Actor:

- Casey Affleck – The Assassination of Jesse James by the Coward Robert Ford

Best Supporting Actress:

- Amy Ryan – Gone Baby Gone

Best Screenplay – Original (tie):

- Diablo Cody – Juno
- Nancy Oliver – Lars and the Real Girl

Best Screenplay – Adapted:

- Joel and Ethan Coen – No Country for Old Men

Best Animated Film:

- Ratatouille

Best Foreign Language Film:

- The Diving Bell and the Butterfly, France

Best Documentary Film:

- Body of War

Best Cast:

- No Country for Old Men

Breakthrough Male Performances:

- Emile Hirsch – Into the Wild

Breakthrough Female Performances:

- Elliot Page (Note: Credited as Ellen Page) – Juno

Best Directorial Debut:

- Ben Affleck – Gone Baby Gone

Career Achievement Award:

- Michael Douglas

Career Award for Cinematography:

- Roger Deakins

William K. Everson Award for Film History:

- Robert Osborne

Freedom of Expression Award:

- The Great Debaters
- Persepolis

== Top Foreign Films ==
The Diving Bell and the Butterfly, France

- 4 Months, 3 Weeks and 2 Days
- The Band's Visit
- The Counterfeiters
- La Vie en Rose
- Lust, Caution

== Top Documentaries ==
Body of War

- Darfur Now
- In the Shadow of the Moon
- Nanking
- Taxi to the Dark Side
- Toots

== Top Independent Films ==
- Away from Her
- Great World of Sound
- Honeydripper
- In the Valley of Elah
- A Mighty Heart
- The Namesake
- Once
- The Savages
- Starting Out in the Evening
- Waitress
