= 19th Producers Guild of America Awards =

19th Annual Producers Guild Awards
- Date: February 2, 2008
- Location: The Beverly Hilton, Beverly Hills, California
- Country: United States
- Presented by: Producers Guild of America

Highlights
- Best Producer(s) Motion Picture: No Country for Old Men – Scott Rudin, Ethan Coen, and Joel Coen
- Best Producer(s) Animated Feature: Ratatouille – Brad Lewis
- Best Producer(s) Documentary Motion Picture: Sicko – Michael Moore and Meghan O'Hara

The 19th Producers Guild of America Awards (also known as 2008 Producers Guild Awards), honoring the best film and television producers of 2007, were held at The Beverly Hilton in Beverly Hills, California, on February 2, 2008. The nominations were announced on November 14, 2007, and January 14, 2008.

== Winners and nominees ==
=== Film ===
Darryl F. Zanuck Award for Outstanding Producer of Theatrical Motion Pictures
- No Country for Old Men – Scott Rudin, Joel Coen, and Ethan Coen
  - The Diving Bell and the Butterfly – Kathleen Kennedy and Jon Kilik
  - Juno – Lianne Halfon, Mason Novick, and Russell Smith
  - Michael Clayton – Jennifer Fox, Kerry Orent, and Sydney Pollack
  - There Will Be Blood – Paul Thomas Anderson, Daniel Lupi, and JoAnne Sellar
Outstanding Producer of Animated Theatrical Motion Pictures
- Ratatouille – Brad Lewis
  - Bee Movie – Jerry Seinfeld and Christina Steinberg
  - The Simpsons Movie – James L. Brooks, Matt Groening, Al Jean, Mike Scully, and Richard Sakai
Outstanding Producer of Documentary Theatrical Motion Pictures
- Sicko – Michael Moore and Meghan O'Hara
  - Body of War – Phil Donahue and Ellen Spiro
  - Hear and Now – Irene Taylor Brodsky
  - Pete Seeger: The Power of Song – Jim Brown, Michael Cohl, and William Eigen
  - White Light/Black Rain: The Destruction of Hiroshima and Nagasaki – Steven Okazaki

=== Television ===
Norman Felton Award for Outstanding Producer of Episodic Television, Drama
- The Sopranos
  - Dexter
  - Grey's Anatomy
  - Heroes
  - House
  - Lost
Danny Thomas Award for Outstanding Producer of Episodic Television, Comedy
- 30 Rock
  - Entourage
  - Extras
  - The Office
  - Ugly Betty
David L. Wolper Award for Outstanding Producer of Long-Form Television
- Bury My Heart at Wounded Knee
  - The Bronx Is Burning
  - High School Musical 2
  - Jane Eyre
  - The Starter Wife
Outstanding Producer of Non-Fiction Television
- Planet Earth
  - 60 Minutes
  - Deadliest Catch
  - Extreme Makeover: Home Edition
  - Kathy Griffin: My Life on the D-List
Outstanding Producer of Live Entertainment & Competition Television
- The Colbert Report
  - The Amazing Race
  - American Idol
  - Project Runway
  - Real Time with Bill Maher

=== David O. Selznick Achievement Award in Theatrical Motion Pictures ===
- Kathleen Kennedy and Frank Marshall

=== Milestone Award ===
- Alan F. Horn

=== Norman Lear Achievement Award in Television ===
- Dick Wolf

=== Stanley Kramer Award ===
Awarded to the motion picture that best illuminates social issues.

- The Great Debaters

=== Vanguard Award ===
Awarded in recognition of outstanding achievement in new media and technology.

- Chad Hurley and Steve Chen

=== Visionary Award ===
Honored to a producer exemplifying unique or uplifting quality.

- Simon Fuller
