= San Diego Film Critics Society Awards 2007 =

Annual US film awards ceremony

12th SDFCS Awards

December 18, 2007

Best Film:
No Country for Old Men

Best Director:
Paul Thomas Anderson
There Will Be Blood

The 12th San Diego Film Critics Society Awards were announced on December 18, 2007.

== Winners ==
- Best Actor:
  - Daniel Day-Lewis – There Will Be Blood
- Best Actress:
  - Julie Christie – Away from Her
- Best Animated Film:
  - Ratatouille
- Best Cast:
  - No Country for Old Men
- Best Cinematography:
  - No Country for Old Men – Roger Deakins
- Best Director:
  - Paul Thomas Anderson – There Will Be Blood
- Best Documentary Film (tie):
  - Crazy Love
  - Deep Water
- Best Editing:
  - Atonement – Paul Tothill
- Best Film:
  - No Country for Old Men
- Best Foreign Language Film:
  - The Diving Bell and the Butterfly (Le scaphandre et le papillon) • France/United States
- Best Production Design:
  - Sweeney Todd: The Demon Barber of Fleet Street – Dante Ferretti
- Best Score:
  - "There Will Be Blood" – Jonny Greenwood
- Best Screenplay – Adapted:
  - There Will Be Blood – Paul Thomas Anderson
- Best Screenplay – Original:
  - Juno – Diablo Cody
- Best Supporting Actor:
  - Tommy Lee Jones – No Country for Old Men
- Best Supporting Actress:
  - Amy Ryan – Gone Baby Gone
