= Austin Film Critics Association Awards 2007 =

Annual US film awards ceremony

3rd AFCA Awards

Best Film:
There Will Be Blood

The 3rd Austin Film Critics Association Awards, honoring the best in filmmaking for 2007, were announced on December 20, 2007.

== Top 10 Films ==
1. There Will Be Blood
2. No Country for Old Men
3. Juno
4. Into the Wild
5. 3:10 to Yuma
6. Knocked Up
7. Before the Devil Knows You're Dead
8. Atonement
9. American Gangster
10. Eastern Promises

== Winners ==
- Best Film:
  - There Will Be Blood
- Best Director:
  - Paul Thomas Anderson – There Will Be Blood
- Best Actor:
  - Daniel Day-Lewis – There Will Be Blood
- Best Actress:
  - Elliot Page (Note: Credited as Ellen Page) – Juno
- Best Supporting Actor:
  - Javier Bardem – No Country for Old Men
- Best Supporting Actress:
  - Allison Janney – Juno
- Best Original Screenplay:
  - Juno – Diablo Cody
- Best Adapted Screenplay:
  - No Country for Old Men – Joel Coen and Ethan Coen
- Best Cinematography:
  - There Will Be Blood – Robert Elswit
- Best Original Score:
  - There Will Be Blood – Jonny Greenwood
- Best Foreign Film:
  - Black Book (Zwartboek) • Netherlands
- Best Documentary:
  - The King of Kong: A Fistful of Quarters
- Best Animated Film:
  - Ratatouille
- Best First Film:
  - Ben Affleck – Gone Baby Gone
- Breakthrough Artist:
  - Michael Cera – Juno and Superbad
- Austin Film Award:
  - Grindhouse – Robert Rodriguez and Quentin Tarantino
