= American Cinema Editors Awards 2008 =

58th ACE Eddie Awards
- Presented by: American Cinema Editors
- Date: February 17, 2008
- Site: The Beverly Hilton, Beverly Hills, California

Highlights
- Best Film: Drama: The Bourne Ultimatum
- Best Film: Musical or Comedy: Sweeney Todd: The Demon Barber of Fleet Street

The 58th ACE Eddie Awards were held on 17 February 2008 in the International Ballroom, Beverly Hilton Hotel, Los Angeles, California, USA; the nominees and winners are listed below.

== Winners and nominees ==
=== Film ===
Best Edited Film - Dramatic:

- Christopher Rouse – The Bourne Ultimatum
  - Jay Cassidy – Into the Wild
  - John Gilroy – Michael Clayton
  - Joel Coen and Ethan Coen (a.k.a. Roderick Jaynes) – No Country for Old Men
  - Dylan Tichenor – There Will Be Blood

Best Edited Film - Musical or Comedy:

- Chris Lebenzon – Sweeney Todd: The Demon Barber of Fleet Street
  - Michael Tronick – Hairspray
  - Dana E. Glauberman – Juno
  - Stephen Rivkin and Craig Wood – Pirates of the Caribbean: At World's End
  - Darren Holmes – Ratatouille

Best Edited Documentary Film:

- Geoffrey Richman, Chris Seward and Dan Swietlik – Sicko
  - Edgar Burcksen and Leonard Feinstein – Darfur Now
  - Leslie Iwerks and Stephen Myers – The Pixar Story

=== Television ===
Best Edited Half-Hour Television Series:

- Steven Rasch – Curb Your Enthusiasm for "The Bat Mitzvah"
  - Ken Eluto – 30 Rock for "The C Word" -
  - Shannon Mitchell – Californication for "Hell-A Woman"

Best Edited Reality Series:

- Michael Glickman and Chuck Montgomery – Cops for "Country Love"
  - Pam Malouf, Hans Van Riet and David Timoner – Dancing With The Stars for "404"
  - Mike Denny – Man Vs. Wild for "Everglades"

Best Edited One-Hour TV Series - Commercial Television:

- Norman Buckley – Chuck for "Pilot"
  - Malcolm Jamieson – Damages for "Pilot"
  - Karen Stern – Law & Order: Special Victims Unit for "Paternity"

Best Edited Miniseries or Television Film - Commercial Television:

- Robert Ferretti and Scott Vickery – The Company: Night 2
  - Mark J. Goldman, Christopher Nelson, Stephen Semel and Henk Van Eeghen – Lost: Through the Looking Glass
  - Paul Dixon – Pictures of Hollis Woods

Best Edited One-Hour Television Series - Non-Commercial Television:

- Sidney Wolinsky – The Sopranos for "Made in America"
  - Stewart Schill – Dexter for "It's Alive"
  - David Siegel – Rome for "De Patre Vostro"

Best Edited Miniseries or Television Film - Non-Commercial Television:

- Tatiana S. Riegel and Leo Trombetta – Pu-239
  - Michael Brown and Michael Ornstein – Bury My Heart at Wounded Knee
  - Mary Jo Markey – Life Support
