= Diablo Cody =

American writer and producer

- Cody in 2026
- Born: Brook Busey; June 14, 1978 (age 48); Lemont, Illinois, U.S.
- Education: University of Iowa (BA)
- Occupations: Writer; producer
- Years active: 2003–present
- Spouses: Jon Hunt (m. 2004; div. 2007) Dan Maurio (m. 2009)
- Children: 3

Brook Maurio (previously Busey-Hunt; née Busey; born June 14, 1978), known professionally by the pen name Diablo Cody, is an American writer and producer. She gained recognition for her candid blog and subsequent memoir, Candy Girl: A Year in the Life of an Unlikely Stripper (2005). Cody received critical acclaim for her screenwriting debut film, Juno (2007), winning both the Academy Award and the BAFTA Award for Best Original Screenplay.

She wrote, produced, and made her directorial debut with the comedy drama film Paradise (2013). Cody has also written and produced the films Jennifer's Body (2009), Young Adult (2011), Ricki and the Flash (2015), Tully (2018), and Lisa Frankenstein (2024).

Cody created, wrote, and produced the Showtime comedy drama series United States of Tara (2009–2011), and the Amazon Prime series One Mississippi (2015–2017). She made her Broadway debut with the Alanis Morissette musical Jagged Little Pill winning the Tony Award for Best Book of a Musical. She has been a member of the Academy of Motion Picture Arts and Sciences in the Writer's Branch since 2008.

== Early life ==
Diablo Cody was born Brook Busey on June 14, 1978, in Lemont, Illinois, a suburb of Chicago, where she and her older brother Marc were raised. She is the daughter of Pam and Greg Busey. Her mother is of Italian descent and her father is of German ancestry. Cody was raised Apostolic Christian and attended Saints Cyril & Methodius School and Benet Academy, Roman Catholic schools in the Chicago suburbs. At this time, she went by her birth name Brook.

In 2000, she graduated from the University of Iowa with a Bachelor of Arts in Media. While at the University of Iowa, she worked in the acquisitions department in the main university library. Her first jobs were doing secretarial work at a Chicago law firm and later proofreading copy for advertisements that played on Twin Cities radio stations.

== Career ==
=== 2001–2004: Blogging and stripping ===
Cody began a parody blog called Red Secretary, detailing the (fictional) exploits of a secretary living in Belarus. The events were thinly veiled allegories for events that happened in Cody's real life, but told from the perspective of a disgruntled, English-idiom-challenged Eastern Bloc girl.

Cody's first bona fide blog appeared under the nickname Darling Girl after she had moved from Chicago to Minneapolis.

In March 2003, Cody started an adult blog called The Pussy Ranch, using a pen name invented while speeding through Cody, Wyoming listening to the song "El Diablo" by Arcadia. On a whim, Cody signed up for amateur night at a Minneapolis strip club called the Skyway Lounge. Having enjoyed the experience, and seeing reader interest, she eventually quit her day job to become a full-time stripper. Cody also spent time working peep shows at Sex World, a Minneapolis adult novelty and DVD store.

While still stripping, Cody began writing for City Pages, an alternative Twin Cities weekly newspaper. She left City Pages just before it changed editorial hands, and later wrote for the now-defunct Jane magazine. In December 2007, Cody began writing a column for the magazine Entertainment Weekly.

=== 2005–2010: Breakthrough and acclaim ===
At the age of 27, Cody wrote her memoir Candy Girl: A Year in the Life of an Unlikely Stripper. The memoir began after Mason Novick, who would become Cody's manager, showed interest in her sharp and sarcastic voice. Based on the popularity of her blog, Novick was able to secure her a publishing contract with New York publisher Gotham Books.

In March 2005, Cody appeared on Late Show With David Letterman to discuss her book at Letterman's request. The host had made it his only official Book Club selection.

After the completion of her book, Cody was encouraged by Novick to try writing a screenplay. Within months, she wrote Juno, a coming-of-age story about a teenager's unplanned pregnancy. The script was completed in February 2005, and was optioned by Mandate Pictures by that summer. The Jason Reitman-directed comedy stars Elliot Page and Michael Cera.

Juno was runner-up for the Toronto International Film Festival People's Choice Award, won second prize at the Rome Film Festival, and earned four Academy Award nominations, including for Best Picture. Cody herself won an Academy Award for Best Original Screenplay for her debut script, which also picked up a Golden Globe nomination and an Independent Spirit Award for Best First Screenplay. She also won screenplay honors from BAFTA, the Writers Guild of America, the Broadcast Film Critics Association, the National Board of Review, the Satellite Awards, and the 2008 Cinema for Peace Award for Most Valuable Work of Director, Producer & Screenwriter (shared with Jason Reitman, John Malkovich, Mason Novick, Russel Smith and Lianne Halfon).

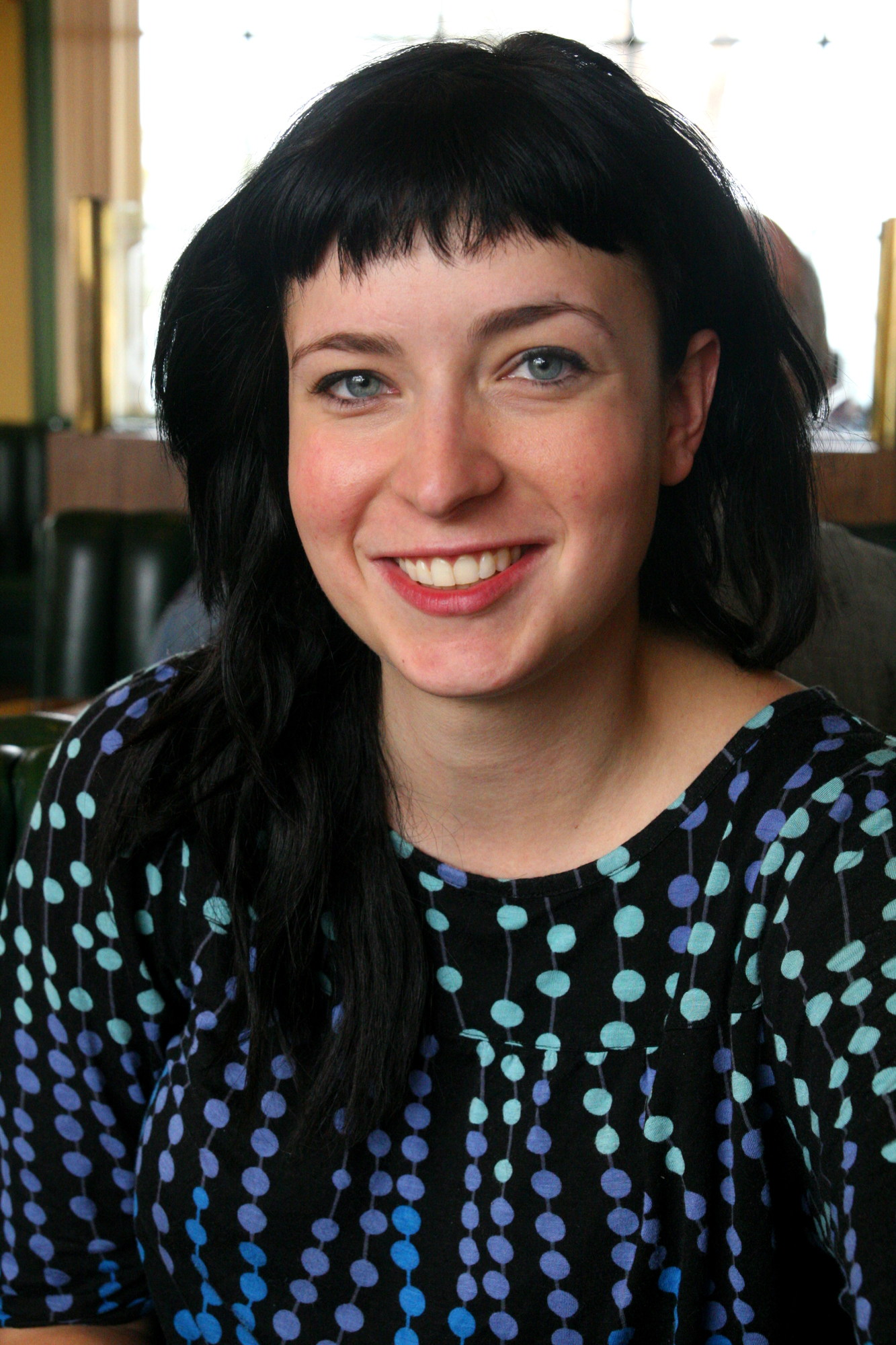
Cody in January 2008

The Juno script was read by many in Hollywood before the film was released, bringing Cody more opportunities. In July 2007, Showtime announced that it would be producing a pilot of Cody's DreamWorks television series, United States of Tara. Based on an idea by Steven Spielberg, Tara is a comedy about a mother with dissociative identity disorder, starring Toni Collette. The series began filming in Spring 2008, and premiered on January 18, 2009.

In October 2007, Cody sold a script titled Girly Style to Universal Studios, and a horror script called Jennifer's Body to Fox Atomic. Released on September 18, 2009, Jennifer's Body starred Megan Fox as the title character and Amanda Seyfried as the supporting character. She revised writer-director Steven Antin's script for his musical film Burlesque.

Cody made a small cameo appearance as herself in a 2008 episode of the television series 90210. She appeared in the same episode that marked the return of Tori Spelling as Donna Martin, in which Cody needed Spelling's character to make a dress for a red carpet event. In 2009, Cody signed on to script and produce a film adaptation of the Sweet Valley High young adult book series.

=== 2011–present: Career expansion ===
In 2011, she was brought in to revise first-time feature director Fede Alvarez's script for the reboot of Sam Raimi's 1980s horror film The Evil Dead. In October 2011, Cody began hosting an online celebrity interview program called "Red Band Trailer," on the broadband channel, L-studio. She originally launched the series privately on YouTube in summer 2010, and the Lexus channel picked it up the following year.

In 2011, Cody wrote and produced the comedy-drama film Young Adult. Cody was nominated by awards associations such as the Broadcast Film Critics Association and the Writers Guild of America. With Jason Reitman, Charlize Theron and Patton Oswalt, she shared the Chairman's Vanguard Award at the Palm Springs International Film Festival. In 2012, the Fempire, the collaboration of writers Cody, Dana Fox, Liz Meriwether, and Lorene Scafaria received the Creativity and Sisterhood Award from the Athena Film Festival for their support for one another in the competitive film industry.

On the WTF with Marc Maron podcast, in February 2012, she said her next project would be directing her first film, which is about a young woman who abandons religion after surviving a plane crash. In February 2013, she announced the film was called Paradise (first known as Lamb of God). Julianne Hough, Holly Hunter, Octavia Spencer, and Russell Brand starred in the cast. Mandate Pictures produced the film, which was released in October 2013.

In May 2013, it was announced that Cody would host her own talk show, Me Time with Diablo Cody, on TBS. The program would tailor "around Diablo’s unique perspective on all things pop culture and told in her very own tongue-in-cheek way," and "reveal a side of Hollywood and celebs that the public very rarely gets to see." Steve Agee was to present and write with her. Cody was a producer, alongside Mark Cronin and Courtland Cox. The series never materialized or made it to air.

Cody had numerous projects that were cancelled or stuck in development hell, including a romantic dramedy called Time and a Half, which was to star Julianne Hough with Ol Parker directing. She also developed a teen drama series with Josh Schwartz for Fox called Prodigy. According to The Hollywood Reporter, it focused on "a 16-year-old genius who through home schooling has been isolated from her peers. Hoping to experience a "normal" teen social life before she enters the adult world of academia, she enrolls in her local high school. Her experiment goes off the rails when she finds herself adopted by a wild crowd, getting caught up in a whirlwind of romance and crime." Cody also created and wrote Warner Bros. Television's romantic comedy series pilot Alex + Amy.

Cody is the spokesperson of Barnard College's Athena Film Festival.

In 2015, Cody was hired to write a new screenplay for Barbie with Amy Schumer eyed as the lead, but left the project in 2018 after struggling to produce a draft that she was proud of.

Cody wrote and produced the musical comedy film Ricki and the Flash (2015), starring Meryl Streep and directed by Jonathan Demme in his last feature film. She also wrote and produced the comedy drama film Tully (2018), reuniting her with Young Adult star Charlize Theron. The film was directed by Jason Reitman, who previously directed Cody's scripts for Juno and Young Adult.

She wrote the book for the Broadway musical Jagged Little Pill, based on the Alanis Morissette album of the same name. The musical premiered in November 2019.

In August 2020, Cody began working with Madonna on a screenplay of the singer's life. However, she later stepped away from the project in May 2022 after turning in a final draft, with the project later being scrapped in January 2023.

In June of 2022, it was announced that Zelda Williams would be making her directorial debut for an adaptation of Cody’s original screenplay Lisa Frankenstein, which Cody produced alongside Mason Novick. The film released in February of 2024 with mixed reviews, though still developing a small cult following.

Initially reported in May 2022, HBO Max announced a script-to-series commitment for a one-hour drama series based on DeuxMoi's novel Anon Pls, via Berlanti Productions in association with Warner Bros. Television. In November 2023, it was revealed that Cody and Ryan O'Connell had been attached as writers.

In May 2025, it was announced that Cody would be executive producer for a television series adaption of Kate Stayman-London's vampire romance book Fang Fiction.

== Personal life ==
In her memoir, Cody wrote fondly of her boyfriend "Jonny" (Jon Hunt). They were married from 2004 until 2007, during which time she was known in personal life as Brook Busey-Hunt. In 2009, she married Dan Maurio, who worked on Chelsea Lately, where Cody also appeared frequently as a "roundtable" guest. They have three sons, born in 2010, 2012 and 2015.

Cody is a friend of screenwriters Dana Fox (What Happens in Vegas, Couples Retreat) and Lorene Scafaria (Hustlers), and they often write their screenplays together to get advice from one another.

In light of Georgia's 2019 anti-abortion law, Cody stated that she didn't know if she would have written Juno if she'd known "the world was going to spiral into this hellish alternate reality", as critics have perceived it as an anti-abortion film. In 2022, she said "Back in 2008, I got a letter from some administrator at my Catholic high school thanking me for writing a movie that was in line with the school’s values. And I was like: 'What have I done?' My objective as an artist is to be a traitor to that culture, not to uplift it" and "I have no regrets about writing the movie. I do think it’s important that I continue to clarify my feelings about it because the last thing I would ever want is for someone to interpret the movie as anti-choice. That is a huge paranoia of mine."

Cody is a roller-coaster enthusiast and has a tattoo of the Giant Dipper at San Diego’s Belmont Park on her right arm.

== Filmography ==
=== Film ===
Year	Title	Credited as		Notes	Ref.
Year	Title	Writer	Producer	Notes	Ref.
2007	Juno	Yes	No		
2009	Jennifer's Body	Yes	Executive		
2010	Tight	Yes	No	short film	
2011	Young Adult	Yes	Yes		
2013	Paradise	Yes	Executive	Also director	
2013	The Magic Bracelet	Yes	No	short film	
2015	Ricki and the Flash	Yes	Yes		
2018	Tully	Yes	Yes		
2024	Lisa Frankenstein	Yes	Yes		
2024	I Love You Forever	No	Yes		
2026	Forbidden Fruits	No	Yes		

Uncredited script revisions

- Burlesque (2010)
- Evil Dead (2013)

=== Television ===
Year	Title	Credited as			Network	Notes	Ref.
Year	Title	Creator	Writer	Executive Producer	Network	Notes	Ref.
2009–2011	United States of Tara	Yes	Yes	Yes	Showtime	36 episodes	
2010	Childrens Hospital	No	Yes	No	Adult Swim	Episode "Show Me on Montana"	
2015–2017	One Mississippi	Yes	Yes	Yes	Amazon Prime Video	12 episodes	

Acting roles

Year	Title	Role	Notes
2008	Sunday Morning Shootout	Herself	Episode "#5.13"
2009	90210	Herself	Episode "Okaeri, Donna!"
2011	Robot Chicken	Various voices	Episode "Catch Me If You Kangaroo Jack"

=== Podcasts ===
Date	Title	Episode
April 12, 2016	Straight Talk with Ross Mathews	"Diablo Cody"
August 13, 2018	The Boo Crew Podcast	"Diablo Cody (Jennifer's Body/Juno)"
May 12, 2019	Eli Roth's History of Horror: Uncut	"Diablo Cody"
May 14, 2019	Keep It!	"The Mystery Files of Constance Wu (with Diablo Cody)"
August 19, 2019	The Margaret Cho	"Diablo Cody, Durk Dehner, & S.R. Sharp"
January 24, 2024	Keep It!	"Oscar Noms & Snubs (with Diablo Cody & Common)"

== Awards and nominations ==
Year	Association	Category	Work	Result	Ref.
2007	Austin Film Critics Association Awards	Best Original Screenplay	Juno	Won	
2007	Chicago Film Critics Association Awards	Best Original Screenplay	Juno	Won	
2007	Dallas–Fort Worth Film Critics Association	Best Screenplay	Juno	Won	
2007	Florida Film Critics Circle Awards	Best Screenplay	Juno	Won	
2007	Online Film Critics Society Awards	Best Original Screenplay	Juno	Won	
2007	San Diego Film Critics Society Awards	Best Original Screenplay	Juno	Won	
2007	Satellite Awards	Best Original Screenplay	Juno	Won	
2007	Washington DC Area Film Critics Association Awards	Best Original Screenplay	Juno	Won	
2008	Academy Awards	Best Original Screenplay	Juno	Won	
2008	BAFTA Awards	Best Original Screenplay	Juno	Won	
2008	Christopher Awards	Best Feature Film	Juno	Won	
2008	Cinema for Peace Award	Most Valuable Work of Director, Producer & Screenwriter	Juno	Won	
2008	Critics' Choice Awards	Best Original Screenplay	Juno	Won	
2008	Golden Globe Awards	Best Screenplay	Juno	Nominated	
2008	Hollywood Film Festival Awards	Breakthrough Screenwriter of the Year	Juno	Won	
2008	Humanitas Prize	Feature Film Category	Juno	Nominated	
2008	Independent Spirit Awards	Best First Screenplay	Juno	Won	
2008	Kansas City Film Critics Circle Awards	Best Original Screenplay	Juno	Won	
2008	Las Vegas Film Critics Society Awards	Best Screenplay	Juno	Won	
2008	National Board of Review Awards	Best Original Screenplay	Juno	Won	
2008	Phoenix Film Critics Society Awards	Best Original Screenplay	Juno	Won	
2008	Southeastern Film Critics Association Awards	Best Original Screenplay	Juno	Won	
2008	Writers Guild of America Awards	Best Original Screenplay	Juno	Won	
2011	Alliance of Women Film Journalists Awards	Best Woman Screenwriter	Young Adult	Nominated	
2011	Central Ohio Film Critics Association Awards	Best Original Screenplay	Young Adult	Nominated	
2011	Georgia Film Critics Association Awards	Best Original Screenplay	Young Adult	Nominated	
2011	Hollywood Film Festival Awards	Screenwriter of the Year	Young Adult	Won	
2011	IndieWire Critics Poll Awards	Best Original Screenplay	Young Adult	Nominated	
2011	Palm Springs International Film Festival Awards	Chairman's Vanguard Award	Young Adult	Won	
2012	Critics' Choice Awards	Best Original Screenplay	Young Adult	Nominated	
2012	Writers Guild of America Awards	Best Original Screenplay	Young Adult	Nominated	
2017	Writers Guild of America Awards	Television: Episodic Comedy	One Mississippi	Nominated	
2019	Alliance of Women Film Journalists Awards	Best Woman Screenwriter	Tully	Nominated	
2019	International Online Cinema Awards	Best Original Screenplay	Tully	Nominated	
2019	Leo Awards	Best Motion Picture	Tully	Nominated	
2019	Women's Image Awards	Best Film Written By a Woman	Tully	Nominated	
2019	Women's Image Awards	Best Film Produced By a Woman	Tully	Nominated	
2020	Outer Critics Circle Awards	Outstanding Book of a Musical	Jagged Little Pill	Won	
2020	Tony Awards	Best Book of a Musical	Jagged Little Pill	Won	
