= 13th Critics' Choice Awards =

2008 US film awards

- Date: January 7, 2008
- Hosted by: D. L. Hughley
- Official website: www.criticschoice.com

Highlights
- Best Film: No Country for Old Men

The 13th Critics' Choice Awards were presented on January 7, 2008, at the Santa Monica Civic Auditorium, honoring the finest achievements of 2007 filmmaking. The ceremony was broadcast on VH1 and hosted by D. L. Hughley. The nominees were announced on December 11, 2007.

== Winners and nominees ==
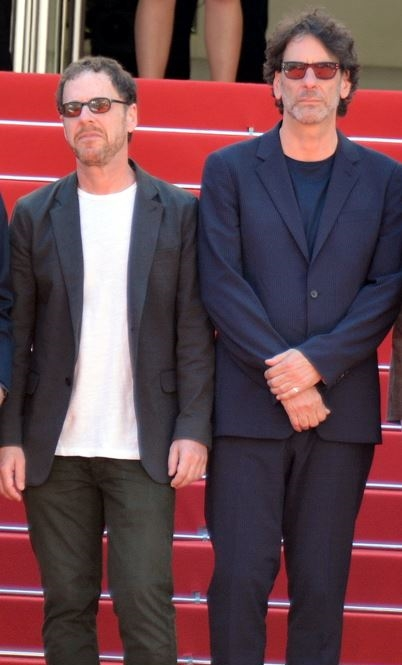
Coen brothers, Best Director winners

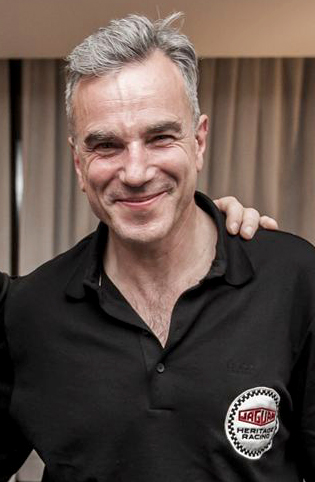
Daniel Day-Lewis, Best Actor winner

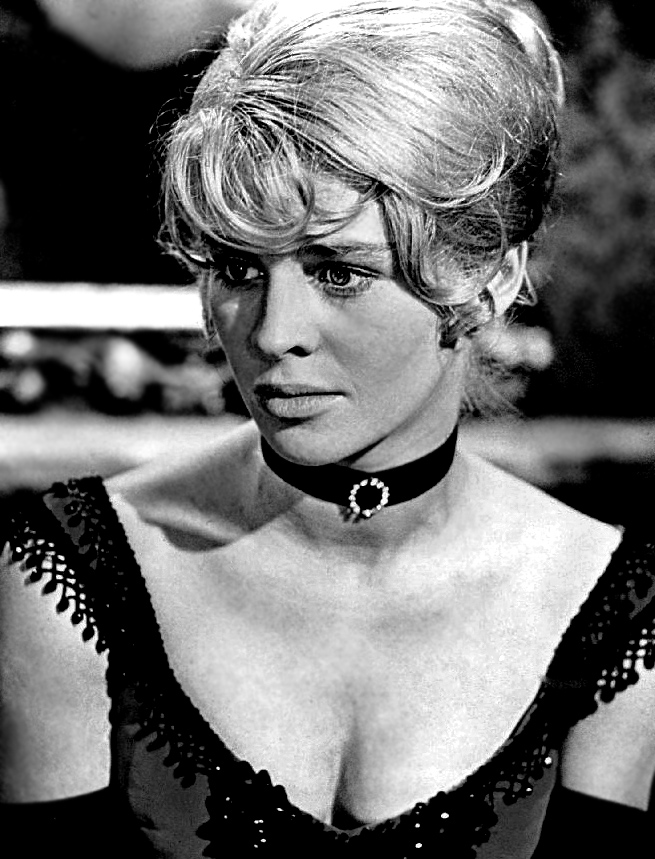
Julie Christie, Best Actress winner

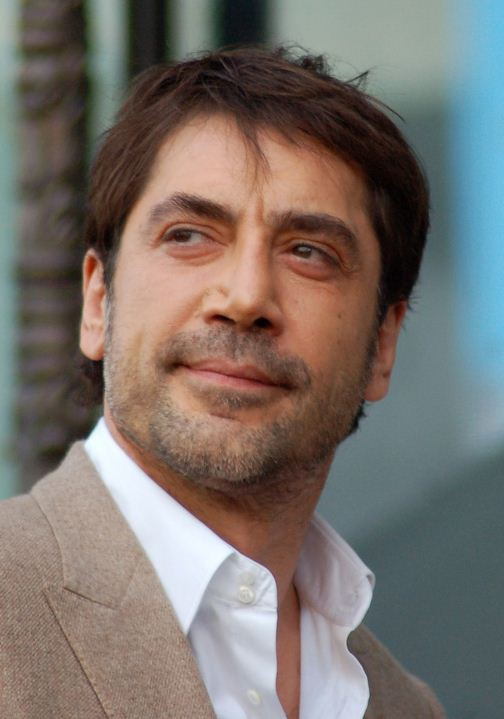
Javier Bardem, Best Supporting Actor winner

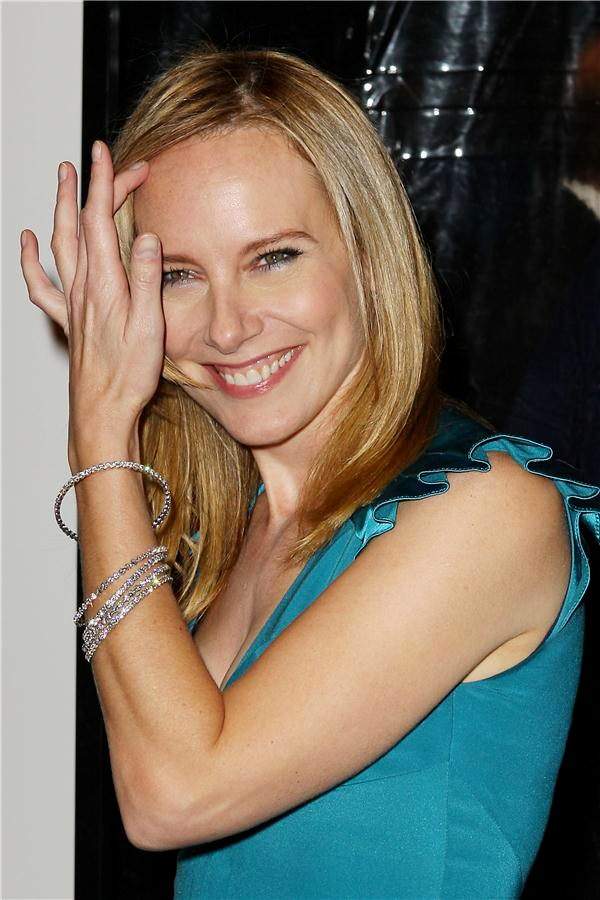
Amy Ryan, Best Supporting Actress winner

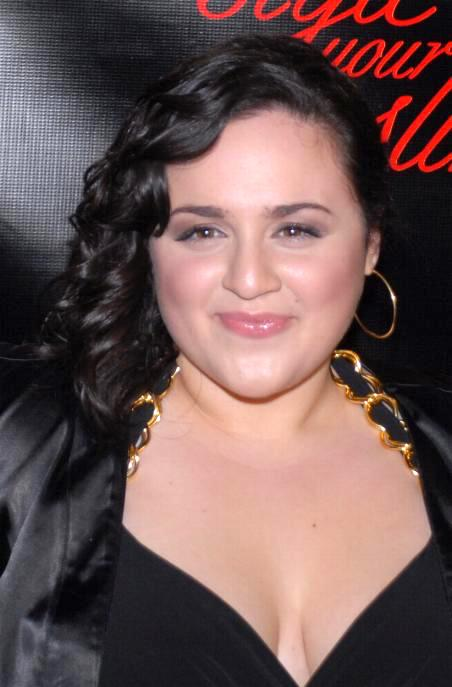
Nikki Blonsky, Best Young Actress winner

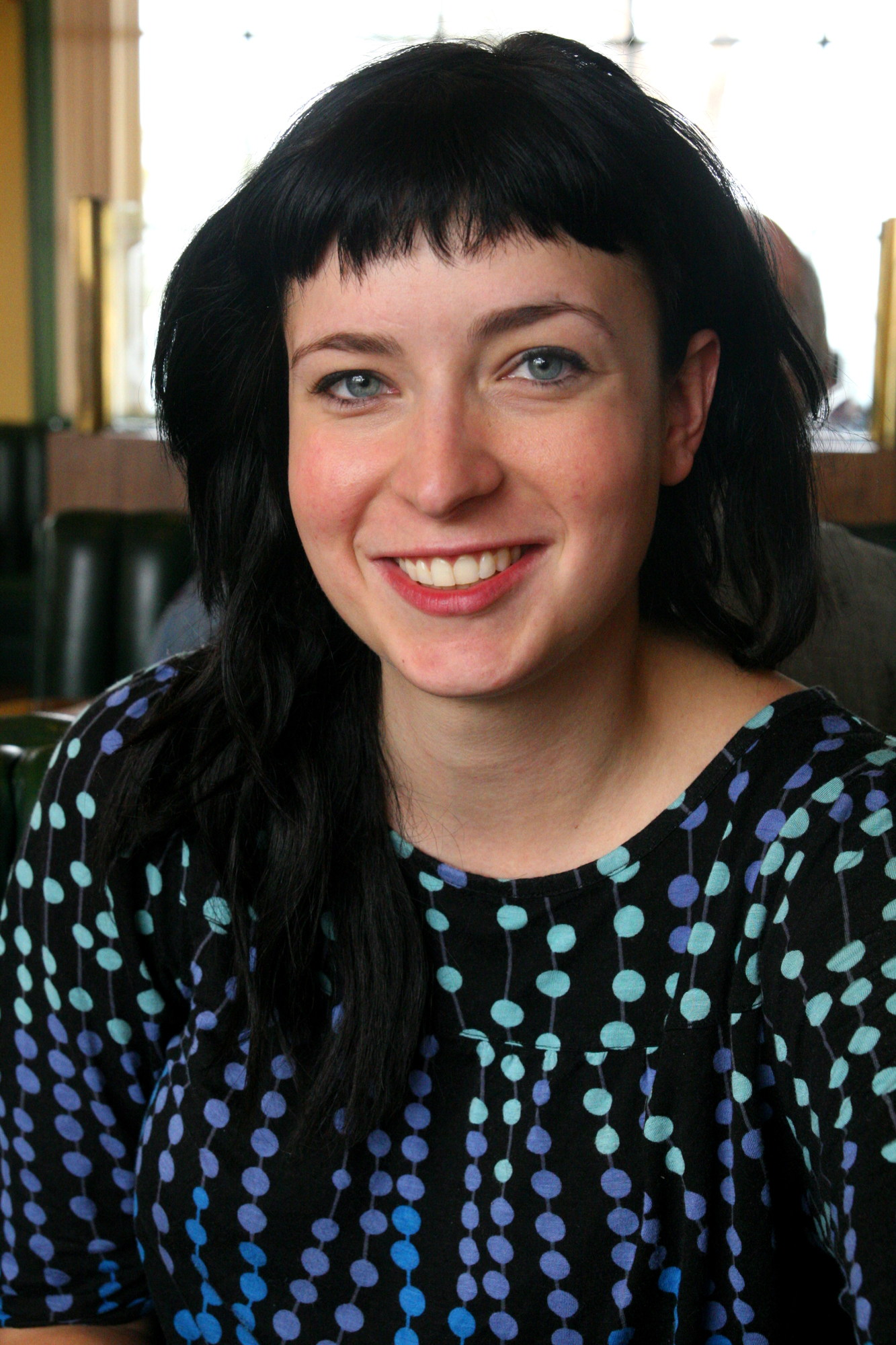
Diablo Cody, Best Writer winner

Best Picture No Country for Old Men: American Gangster; Atonement; The Diving Bell and the Butterfly; Into the Wild; Juno; The Kite Runner; Michael Clayton; Sweeney Todd: The Demon Barber of Fleet Street; There Will Be Blood	Best Director Joel Coen and Ethan Coen – No Country for Old Men: Tim Burton – Sweeney Todd: The Demon Barber of Fleet Street; Sidney Lumet – Before the Devil Knows You're Dead; Sean Penn – Into the Wild; Julian Schnabel – The Diving Bell and the Butterfly; Joe Wright – Atonement
Best Actor Daniel Day-Lewis – There Will Be Blood as Daniel Plainview: George Clooney – Michael Clayton as Michael Clayton; Johnny Depp – Sweeney Todd: The Demon Barber of Fleet Street as Benjamin Barker / Sweeney Todd; Ryan Gosling – Lars and the Real Girl as Lars Lindstrom; Emile Hirsch – Into the Wild as Chris McCandless; Viggo Mortensen – Eastern Promises as Nikolai Luzhin	Best Actress Julie Christie – Away from Her as Fiona Anderson: Amy Adams – Enchanted as Giselle; Cate Blanchett – Elizabeth: The Golden Age as Elizabeth I; Marion Cotillard – La Vie en Rose as Édith Piaf; Angelina Jolie – A Mighty Heart as Mariane Pearl; Elliot Page (Note: Credited as Ellen Page) – Juno as Juno MacGuff
Best Supporting Actor Javier Bardem – No Country for Old Men as Anton Chigurh: Casey Affleck – The Assassination of Jesse James by the Coward Robert Ford as Robert Ford; Philip Seymour Hoffman – Charlie Wilson's War as Gust Avrakotos; Hal Holbrook – Into the Wild as Ron Franz; Tom Wilkinson – Michael Clayton as Arthur Edens	Best Supporting Actress Amy Ryan – Gone Baby Gone as Helene McCready: Cate Blanchett – I'm Not There as Jude Quinn; Catherine Keener – Into the Wild as Jan Burres; Vanessa Redgrave – Atonement as Older Briony; Tilda Swinton – Michael Clayton as Karen Crowder
Best Young Actor Ahmad Khan Mahmoodzada – The Kite Runner as Young Hassan: Michael Cera – Juno as Paulie Bleeker; Michael Cera – Superbad as Evan; Freddie Highmore – August Rush as Evan Taylor; Ed Sanders – Sweeney Todd: The Demon Barber of Fleet Street as Tobias Ragg	Best Young Actress Nikki Blonsky – Hairspray as Tracy Turnblad: Dakota Blue Richards – The Golden Compass as Lyra Belacqua; AnnaSophia Robb – Bridge to Terabithia as Leslie Burke; Saoirse Ronan – Atonement as Briony Tallis, aged 13
Best Acting Ensemble Hairspray: Before the Devil Knows You're Dead; Gone Baby Gone; Juno; No Country for Old Men; Sweeney Todd: The Demon Barber of Fleet Street	Best Writer Juno – Diablo Cody: Charlie Wilson's War – Aaron Sorkin; Into the Wild – Sean Penn; Lars and the Real Girl – Nancy Oliver; Michael Clayton – Tony Gilroy; No Country for Old Men – Joel Coen and Ethan Coen
Best Animated Feature Ratatouille: Bee Movie; Beowulf; Persepolis; The Simpsons Movie	Best Documentary Feature Sicko: Darfur Now; In the Shadow of the Moon; The King of Kong; No End in Sight; Sharkwater
Best Family Film Enchanted: August Rush; The Golden Compass; Hairspray; Harry Potter and the Order of the Phoenix	Best Foreign Language Film The Diving Bell and the Butterfly • France / United States: 4 Months, 3 Weeks and 2 Days • Romania; La Vie en Rose • Czech Republic / France / United Kingdom; Lust, Caution • China / Taiwan / United States; The Orphanage • Spain
Best Composer There Will Be Blood – Jonny Greenwood: 3:10 to Yuma – Marco Beltrami; Atonement – Dario Marianelli; Enchanted – Alan Menken; Grace Is Gone – Clint Eastwood; Lust, Caution – Alexandre Desplat	Best Song "Falling Slowly" – Once: "Come So Far (Got So Far to Go)" – Hairspray; "Do You Feel Me" – American Gangster; "Guaranteed" – Into the Wild; "That's How You Know" – Enchanted
Best Comedy Movie Juno: Dan in Real Life; Hairspray; Knocked Up; Superbad	

=== Joel Siegel Award ===
Don Cheadle

=== Best Picture Made for Television ===
Bury My Heart at Wounded Knee

- The Company
- Tin Man
- The War

== Statistics ==
Nominations	Film
7	Into the Wild
6	Juno
5	Atonement
5	Hairspray
5	Michael Clayton
5	No Country for Old Men
5	Sweeney Todd: The Demon Barber of Fleet Street
4	Enchanted
3	The Diving Bell and the Butterfly
3	There Will Be Blood
2	American Gangster
2	August Rush
2	Before the Devil Knows You're Dead
2	Charlie Wilson's War
2	The Golden Compass
2	Gone Baby Gone
2	The Kite Runner
2	Lars and the Real Girl
2	La Vie en Rose
2	Lust, Caution
2	Superbad

Wins	Film
3	No Country for Old Men
2	Hairspray
2	Juno
2	There Will Be Blood
