= 2008 Independent Spirit Awards =

The 2008 Independent Spirit Awards can refer to:

- 23rd Independent Spirit Awards, a ceremony held in 2008, honoring the films of 2009
- 24th Independent Spirit Awards, a ceremony held in 2009, honoring the films of 2008
