= But Not for Me =

But Not for Me may refer to:

- "But Not for Me" (song), a 1930 popular song by George and Ira Gershwin
- But Not for Me (film), a 1959 film starring Clark Gable and Carroll Baker
- But Not for Me, a 2015 American musical romantic drama film starring Marcus Carl Franklin
