= Jernigan (novel) =

1991 novel by David Gates

- First edition cover
- Editor: Gary Fisketjon
- Author: David Gates
- Cover artist: Chip Kidd (design); Anne Turyn (photo)
- Language: English
- Genre: Tragicomedy
- Published: 1991
- Publisher: Vintage Contemporaries
- Publication place: United States
- Media type: Print (hardback and paperback)
- Pages: 256 pp
- ISBN: 0679737138

Jernigan is the 1991 debut novel by David Gates. The book received widespread critical acclaim, drawing comparisons to Richard Yates, Joseph Heller, and Frederick Exley. Jernigan was a finalist for the 1992 Pulitzer Prize in Fiction.

== Plot summary ==
Peter Jernigan, the eponymous narrator, is an alcoholic widower in his late 30s who tells the darkly comic story of his attempts to raise his teenage son Danny in the suburbs of New Jersey in the year following the suicide of his wife. When Jernigan begins an affair with Martha, the mother of Danny's girlfriend and a self-styled "suburban survivalist" who breeds rabbits in her basement, his drinking turns harder and his life begins to spiral completely out of control.

== Critical reception ==
Reviewing the novel for The New York Times, critic Michiko Kakutani wrote, "The minute he starts talking, Peter Jernigan, the narrator of David Gates's astonishing first novel, grabs you by the lapels and compels you to listen to the sad-funny-tragic story of his life. His voice is one of those distinctive, all-American voices: brash, sarcastic, rueful and boyish, all at the same time. He sounds like a Holden Caulfield who has grown up to find himself trapped in a novel by Richard Yates." Douglas Seibold of The Chicago Tribune wrote, "It is a compelling ride, and makes for compelling reading. But it is Jernigan's voice, the hectoring, profane, desperate voice with which he tells the story of his fall, that is the motivating force." Kirkus Reviews wrote that while "not as wildly lyrical or funny as A Fan's Notes, it's nevertheless a frighteningly believable portrait of a self-created hell." In reviewing the 2015 UK reissue of Jernigan for The Independent, Doug Johnstone wrote, "Re-reading Jernigan, I was struck all over again at how brutal and brilliant it is. The author Stuart Evers, in his insightful and passionate foreword to this new edition, claims that it deserves to be rediscovered in a similar fashion to Stoner or Revolutionary Road. While I agree with that sentiment entirely, Jernigan feels like a more powerful piece of writing than those books, a howl into the abyss, a very modern American rage against the indignities of life and death."

== Awards and honors ==
- 1992 Pulitzer Prize in Fiction (Finalist)
