= Independent Spirit Award for Best Supporting Male =

Former annual award for performance in independent film

- Presented by: Film Independent
- First award: Morgan Freeman – Street Smart (1988)
- Final award: Troy Kotsur – CODA (2021)
- Website: filmindependent.org

The Independent Spirit Award for Best Supporting Male was one of the annual Independent Spirit Awards. It was first presented in 1987, with Morgan Freeman being the first recipient, for his role as Fast Black in Street Smart. It was last presented in 2022 with Troy Kotsur being the final recipient of the award for his role in CODA.

In 2022, it was announced that the four acting categories would be retired and replaced with two gender neutral categories, with both Best Supporting Male and Best Supporting Female merging into the Best Supporting Performance category.

Steve Buscemi, Willem Dafoe and Benicio del Toro are the only actors who have received this award more than once, with two wins each.

== Winners and nominees ==
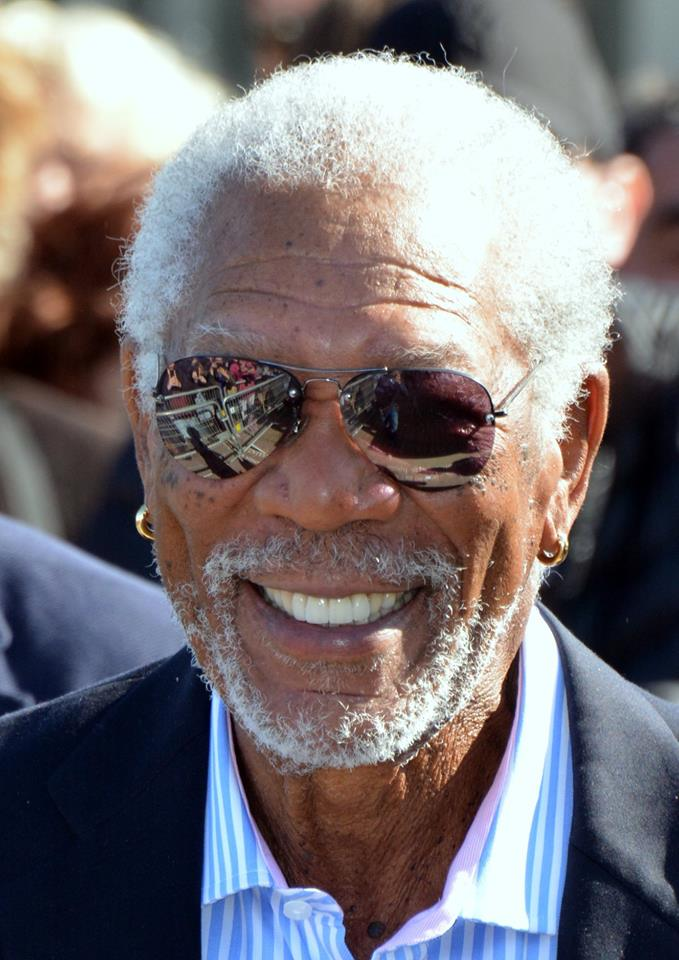
Morgan Freeman was the first recipient of the award in 1987 for Street Smart.

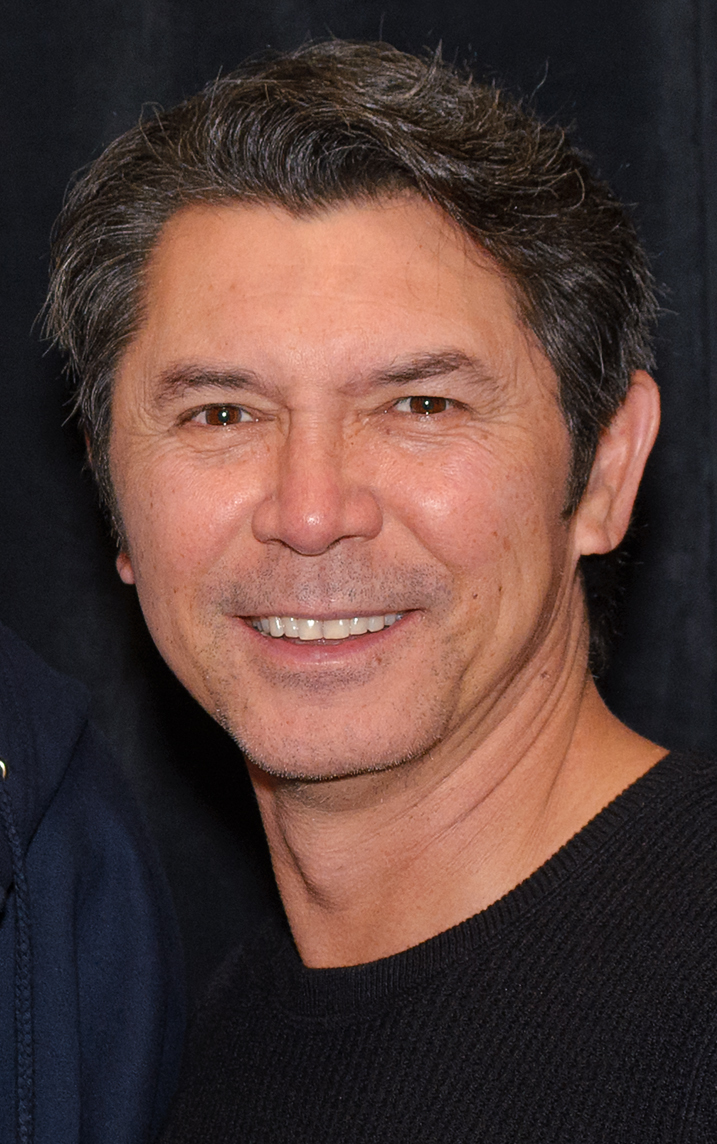
Lou Diamond Phillips won for Stand and Deliver.

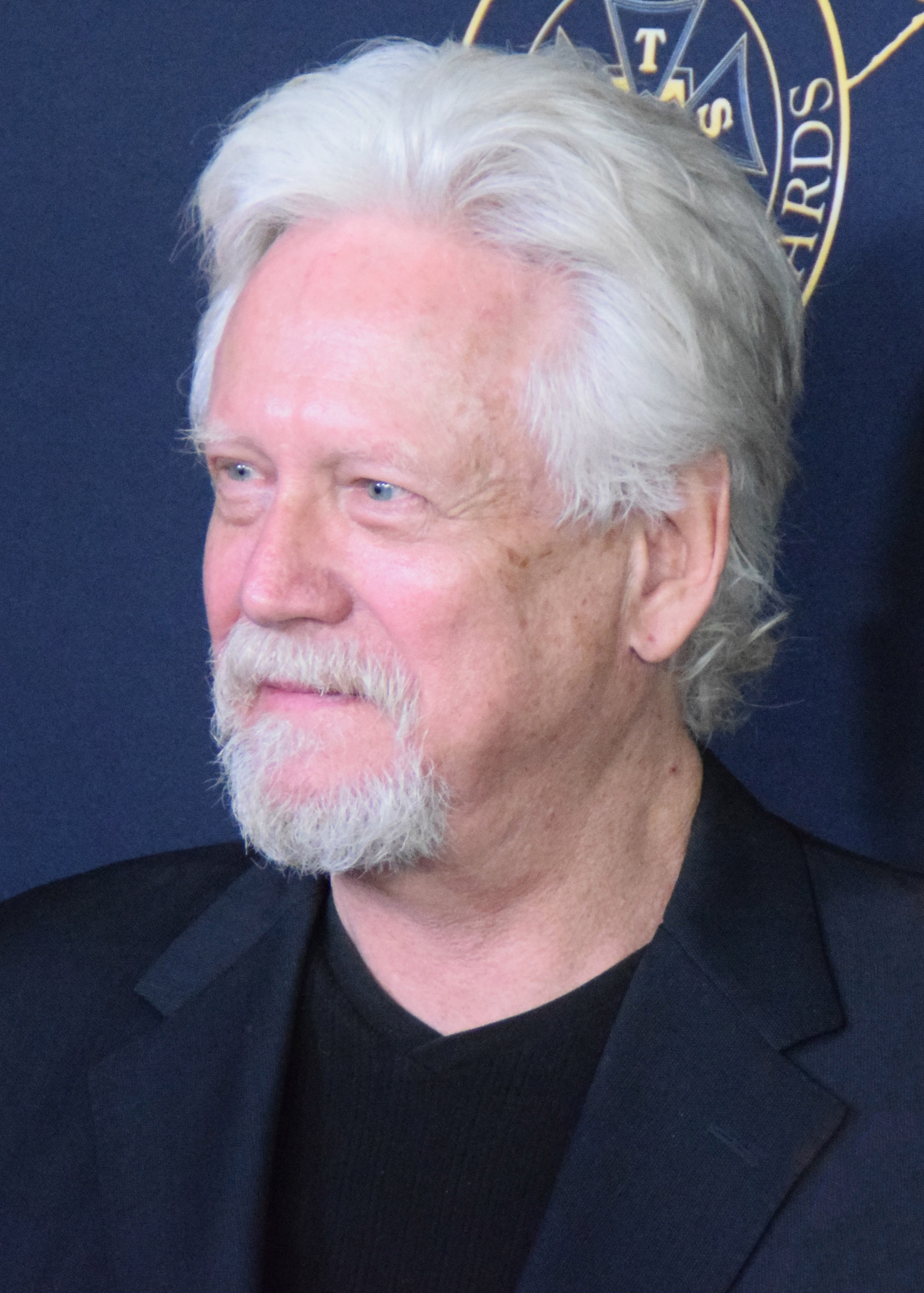
Bruce Davison won for Longtime Companion.

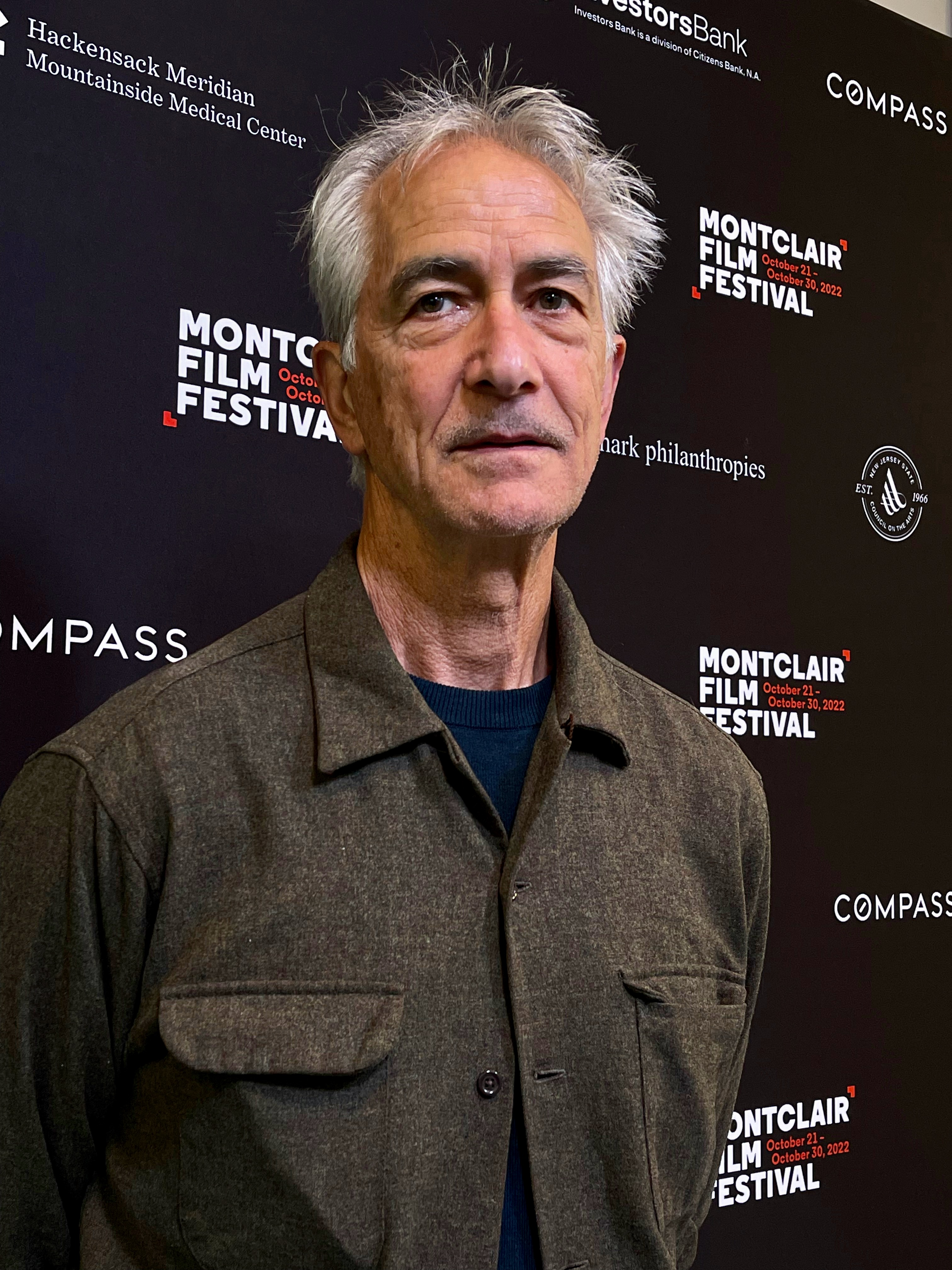
David Strathairn won for City of Hope.

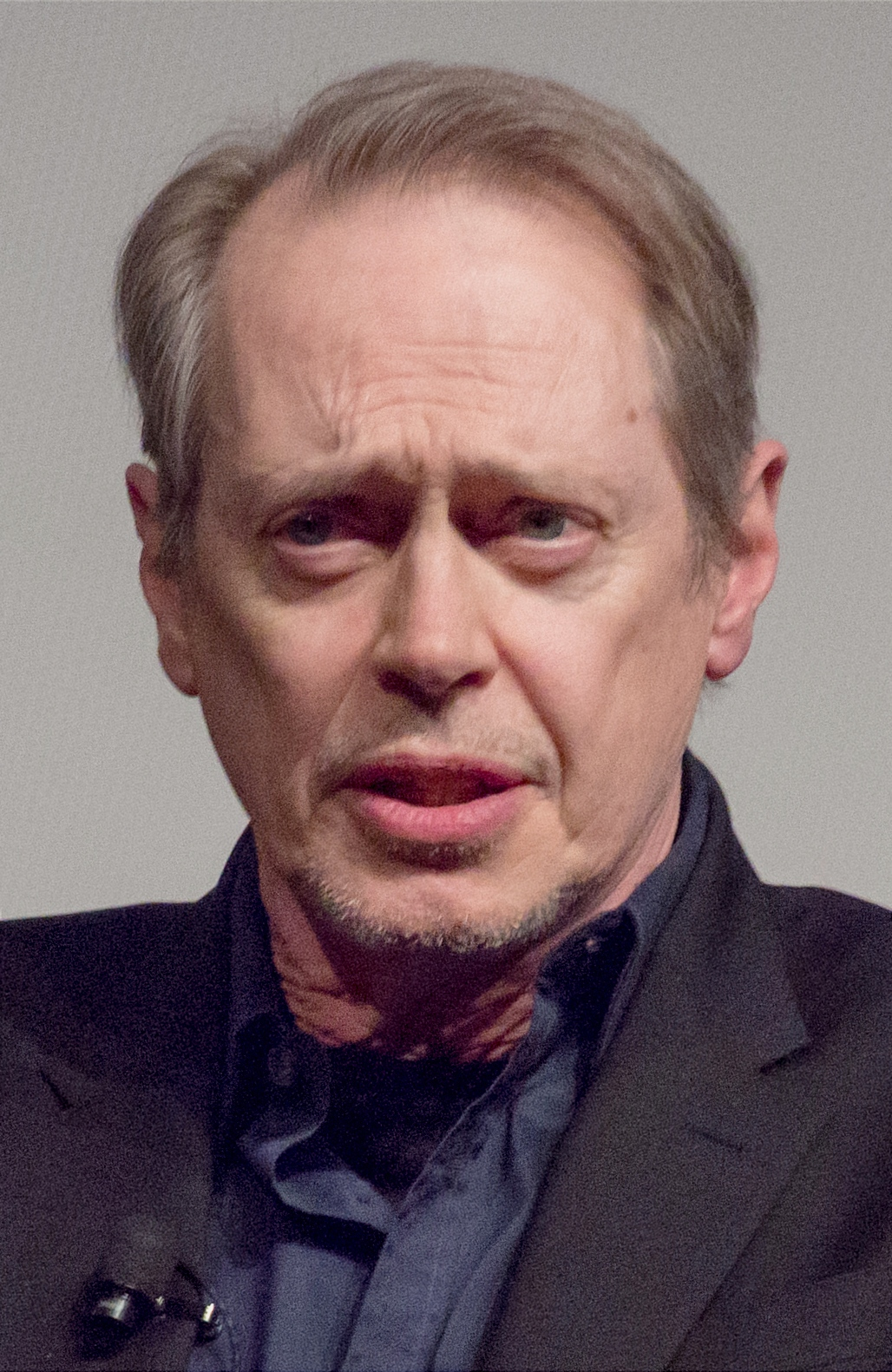
Steve Buscemi won twice: Reservoir Dogs (1992) and Ghost World (2001).

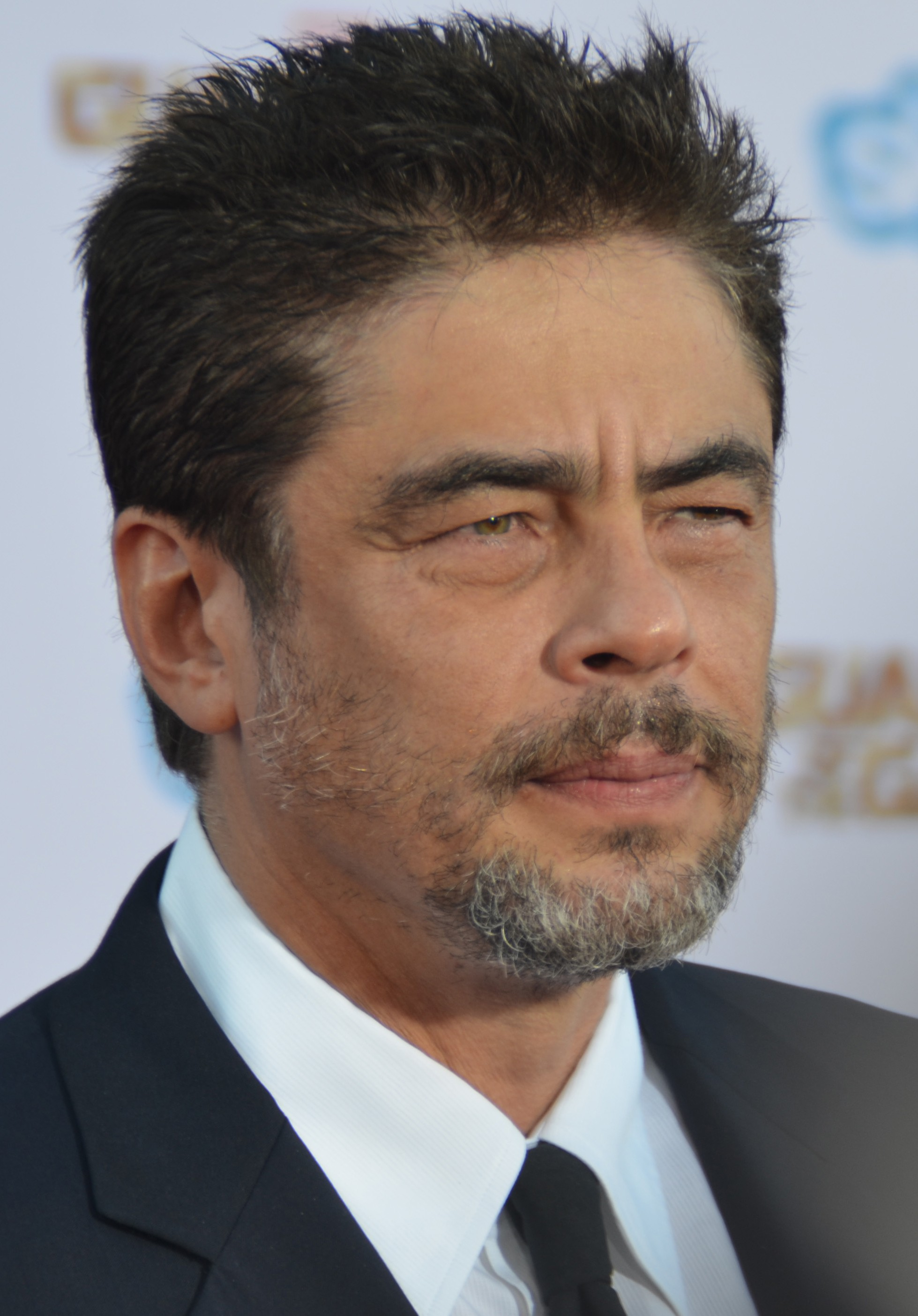
Benicio del Toro won twice: The Usual Suspects (1995) and Basquiat (1996).

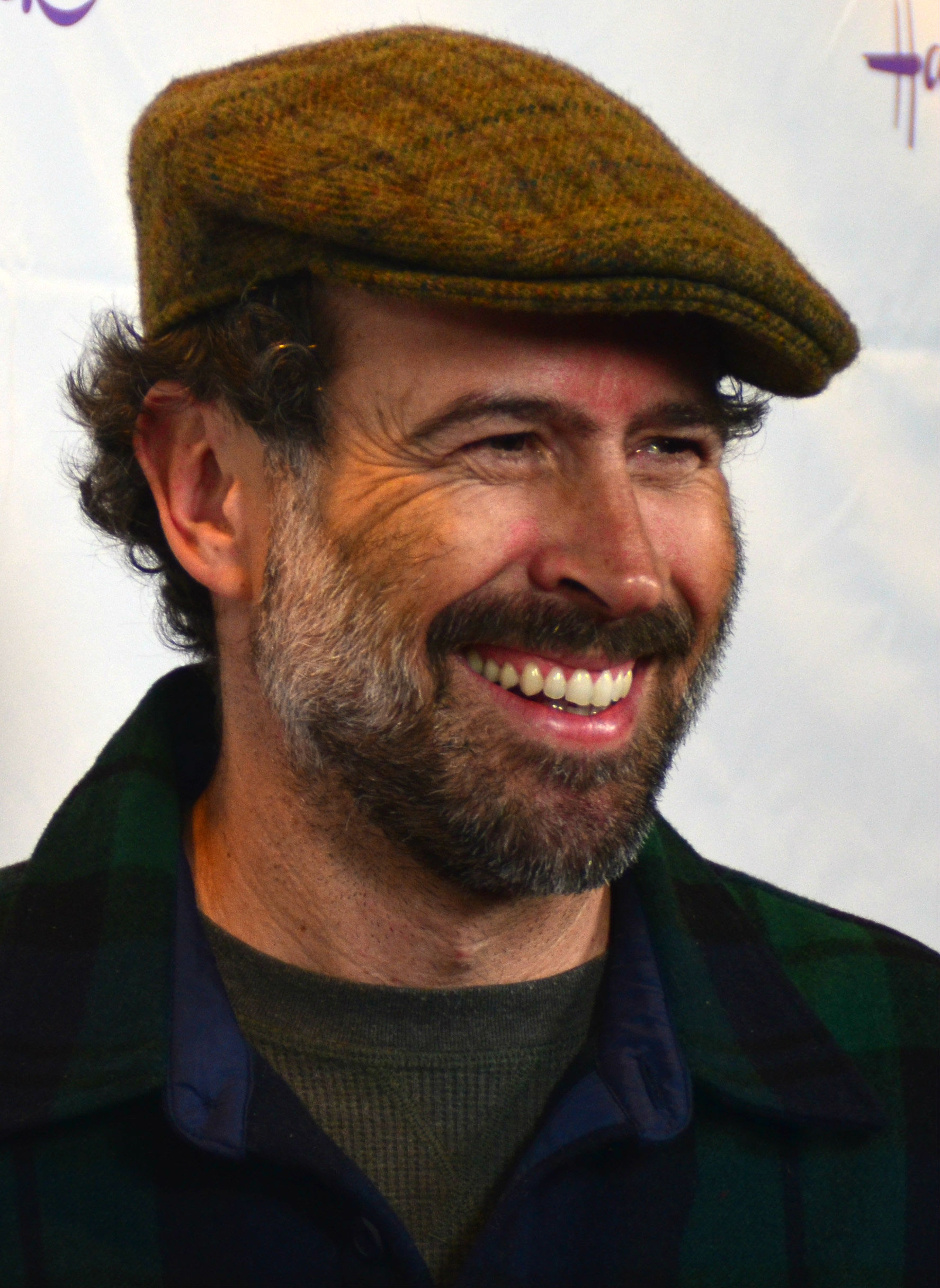
Jason Lee won for Chasing Amy.

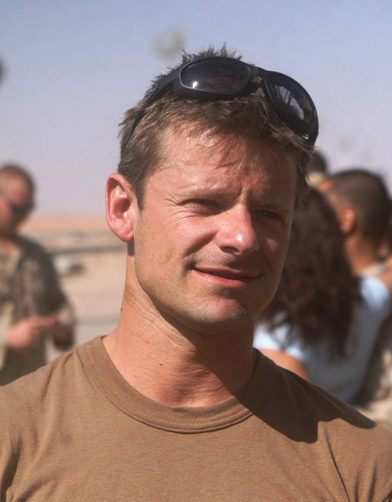
Steve Zahn won for Happy, Texas.

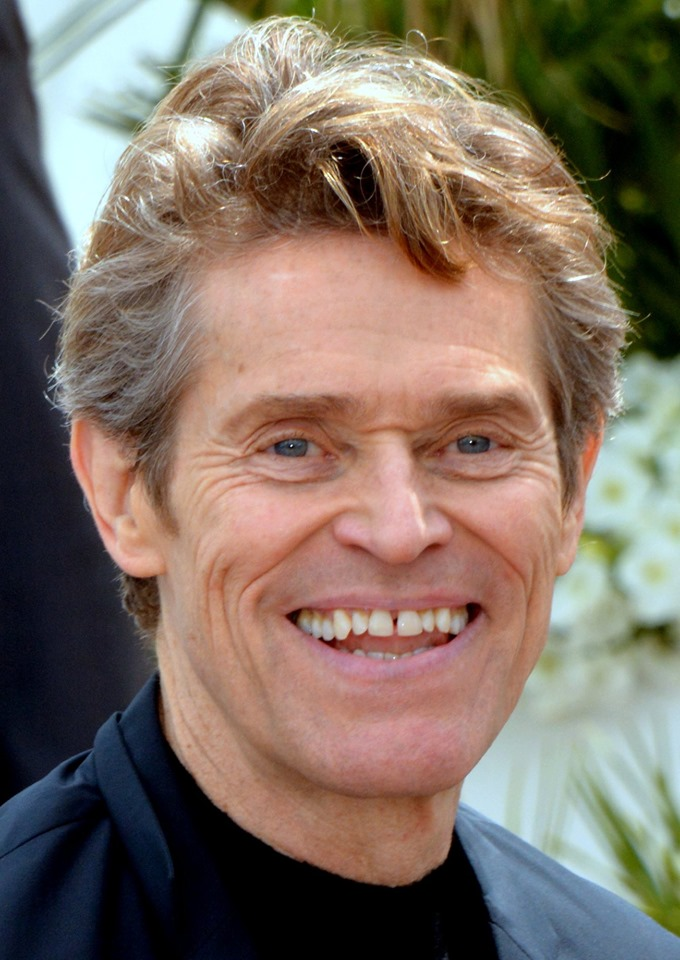
Willem Dafoe won twice: Shadow of the Vampire (2000) and The Lighthouse (2019).

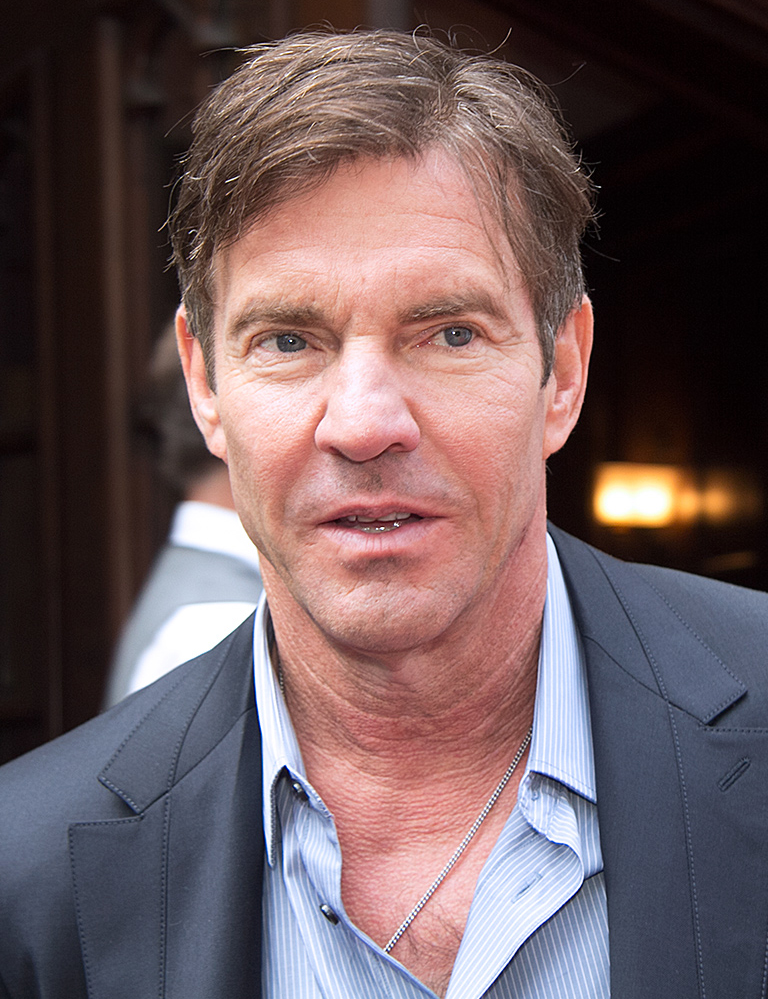
Dennis Quaid won for Far from Heaven.

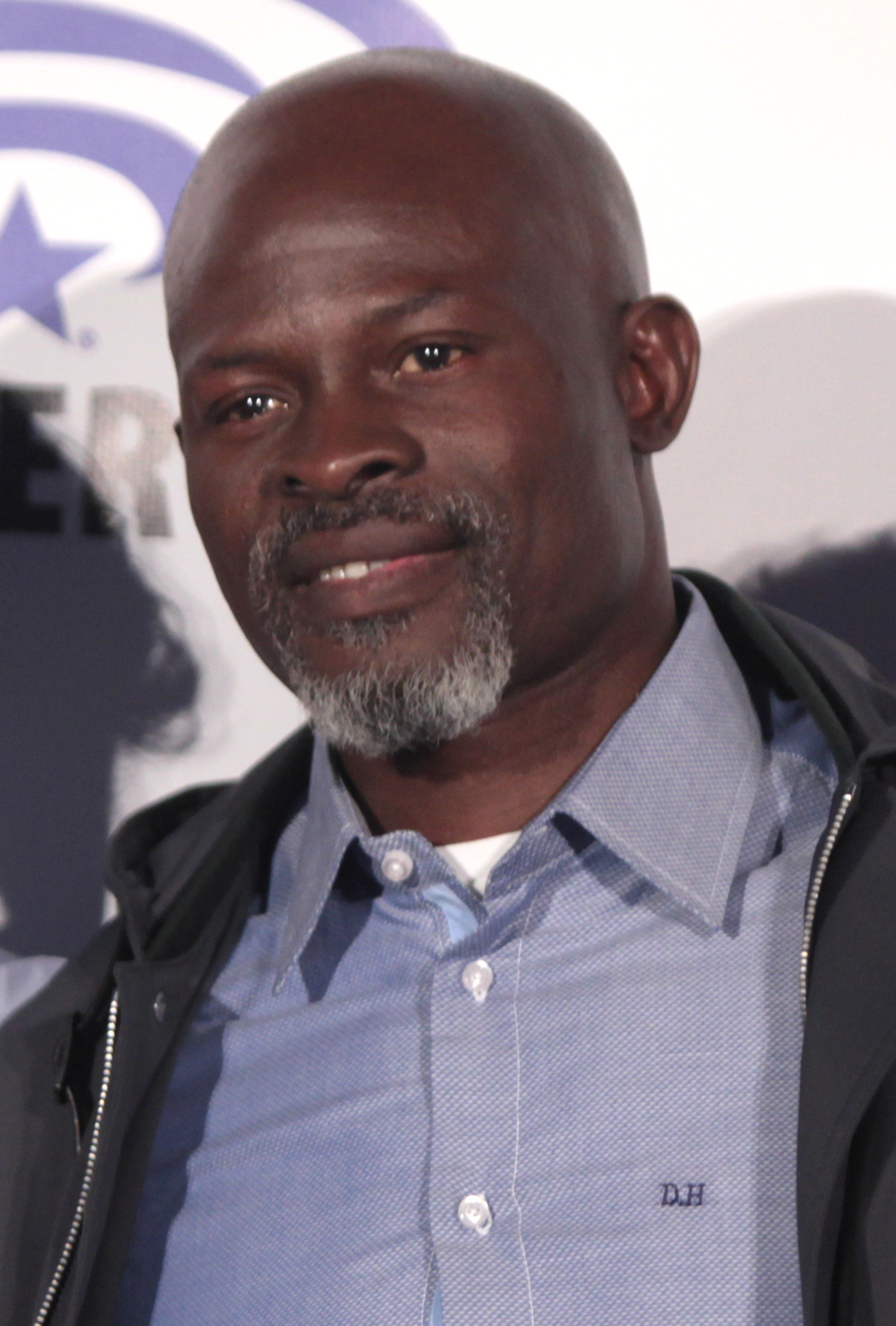
Djimon Hounsou won for In America.

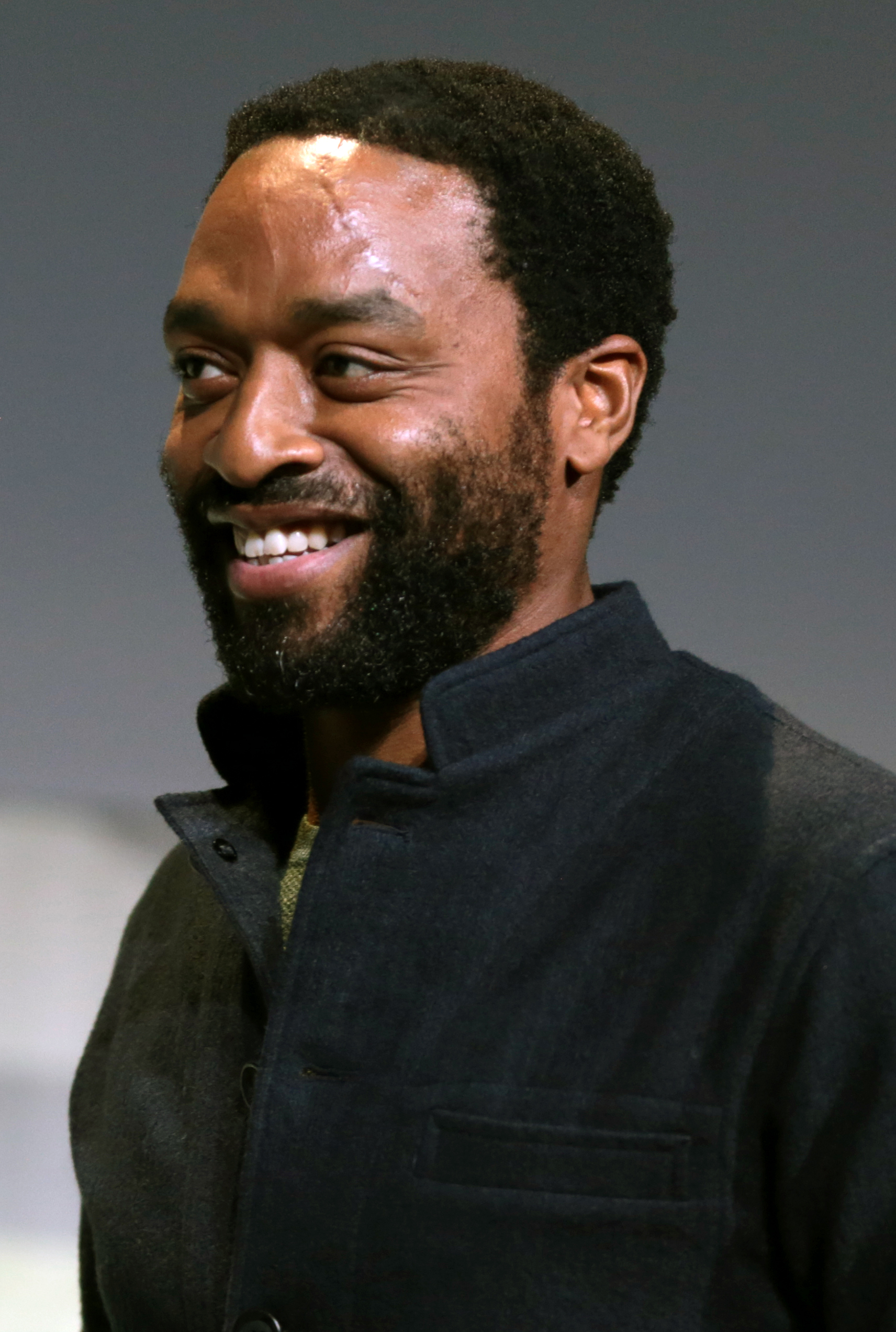
Chiwetel Ejiofor won for Talk to Me.

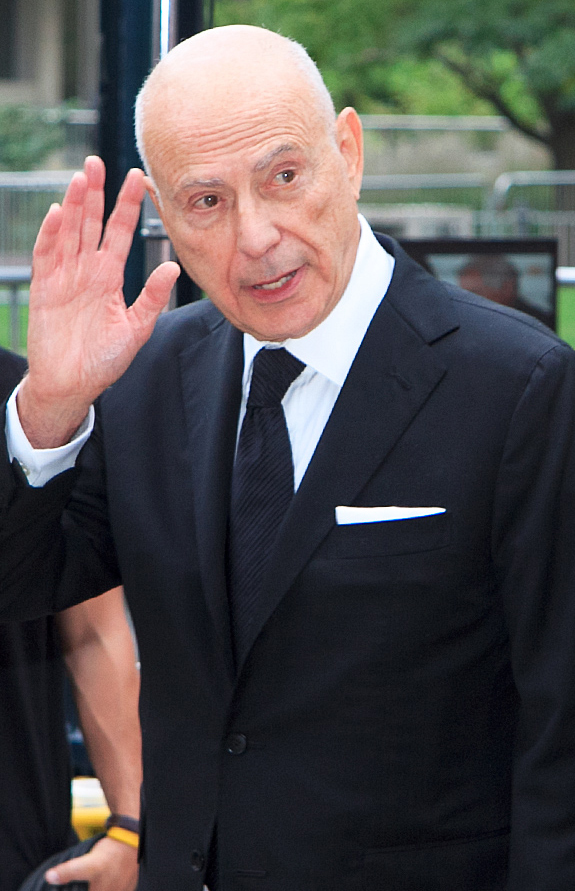
Alan Arkin won for Little Miss Sunshine (2006).

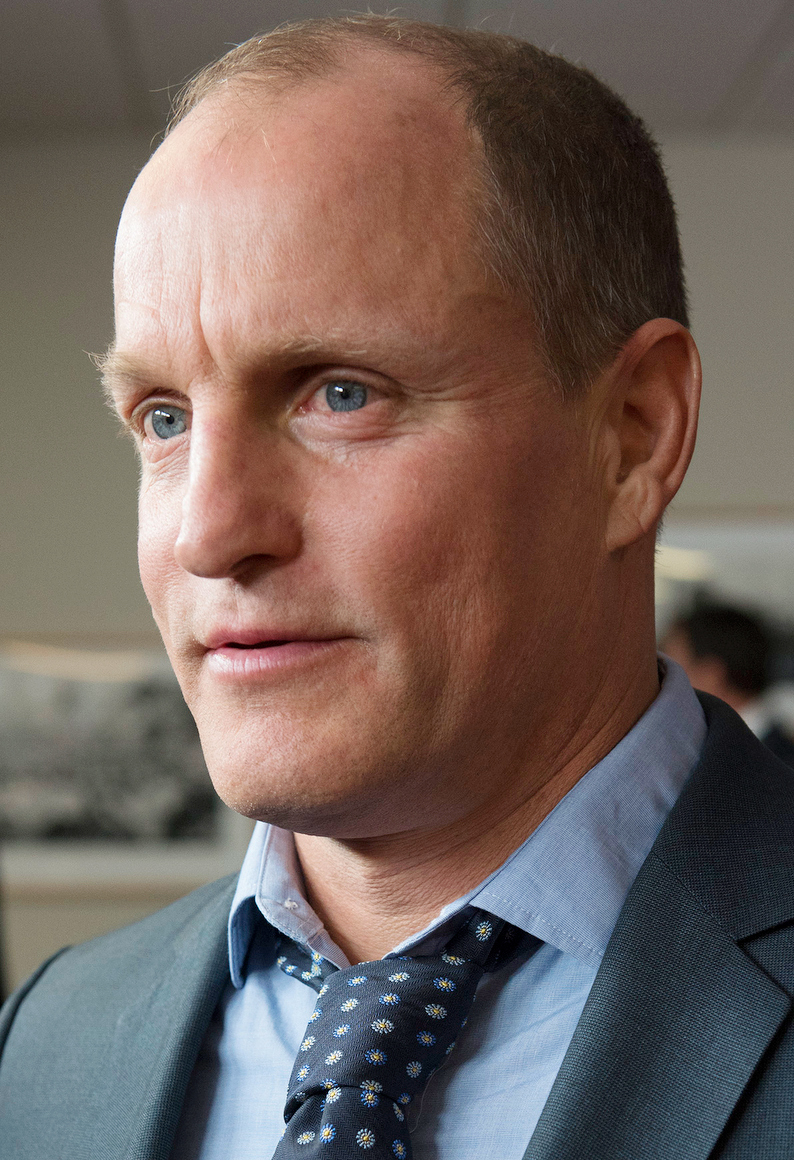
Woody Harrelson won for The Messenger.

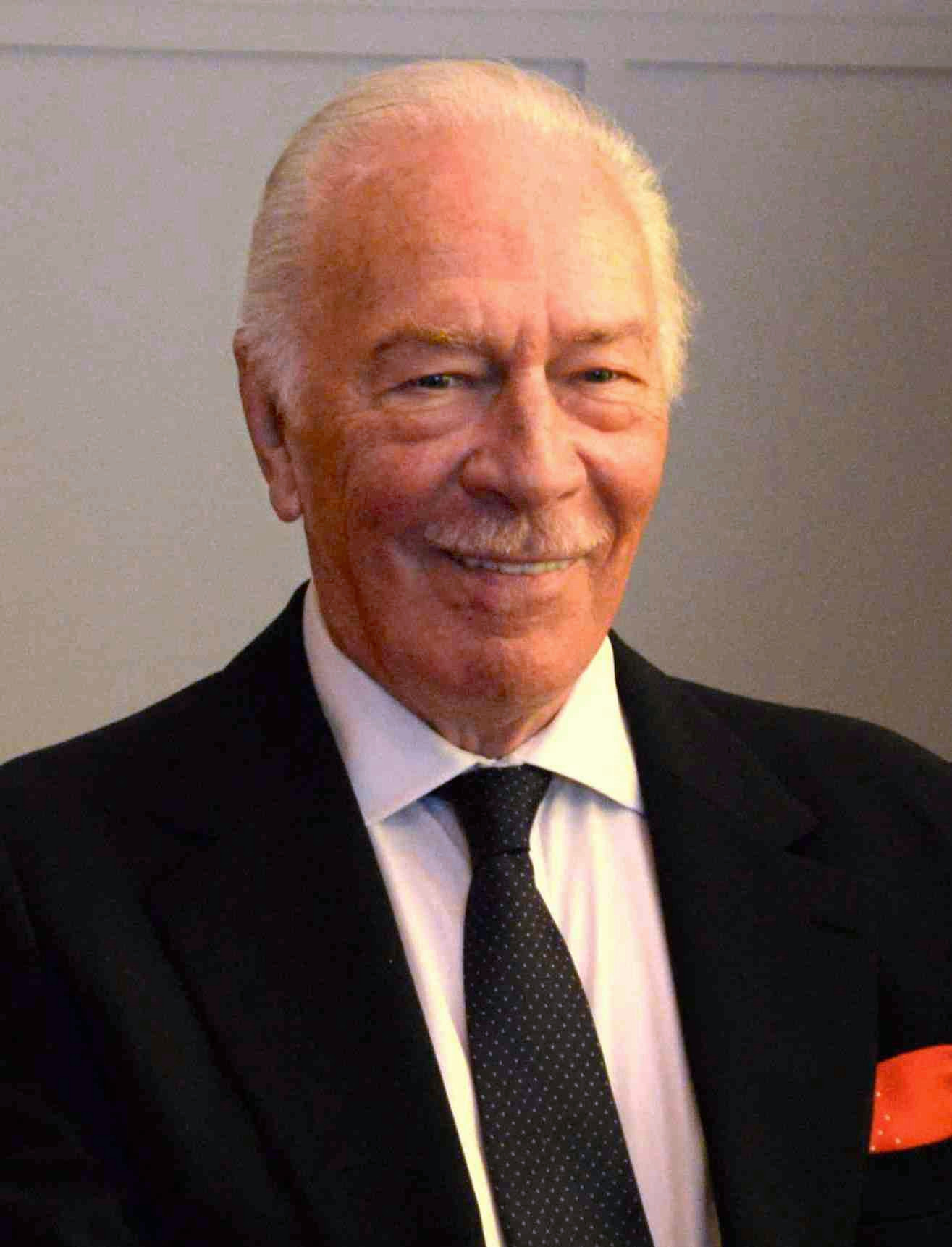
Christopher Plummer won for Beginners.

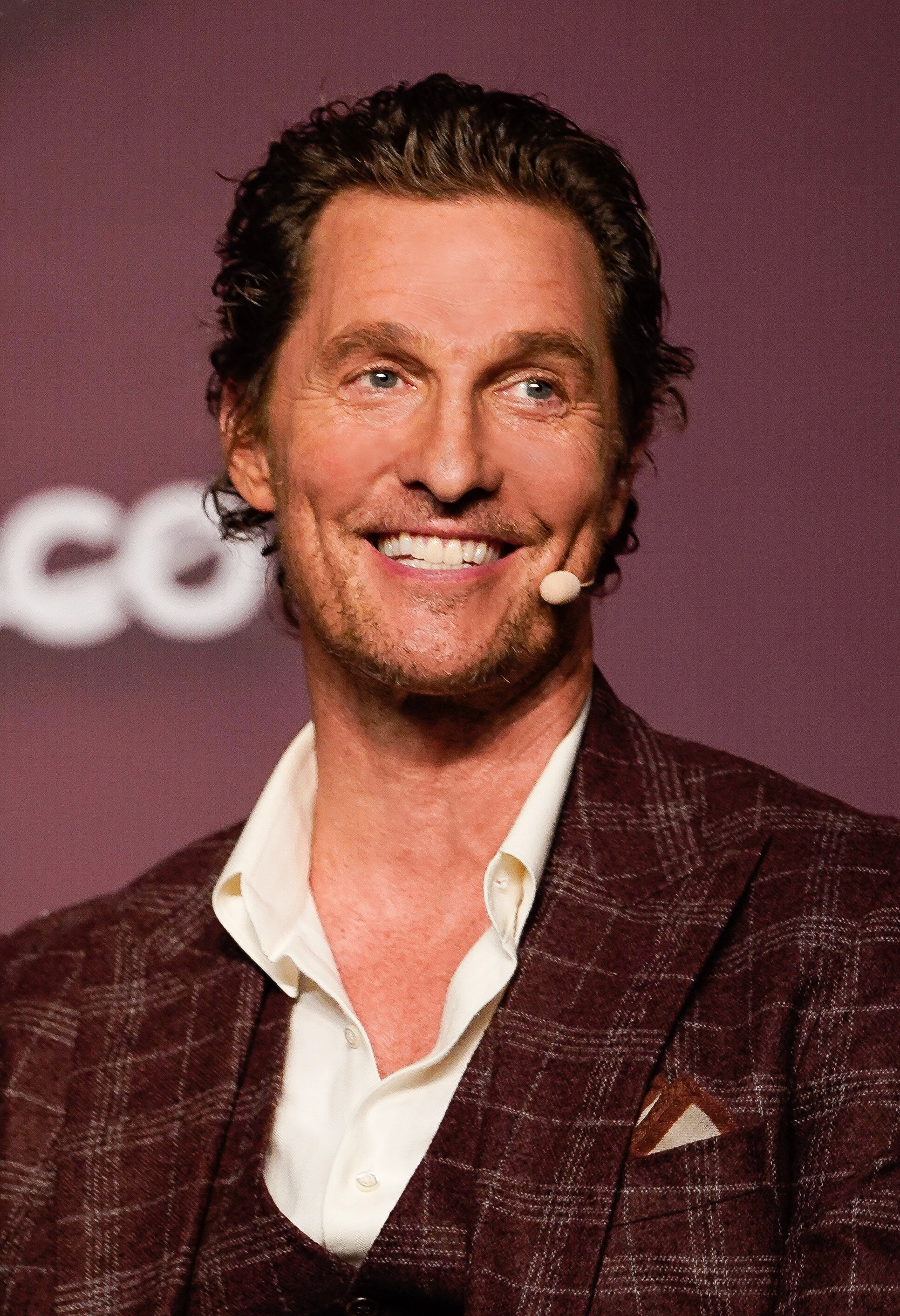
Matthew McConaughey won for Magic Mike.

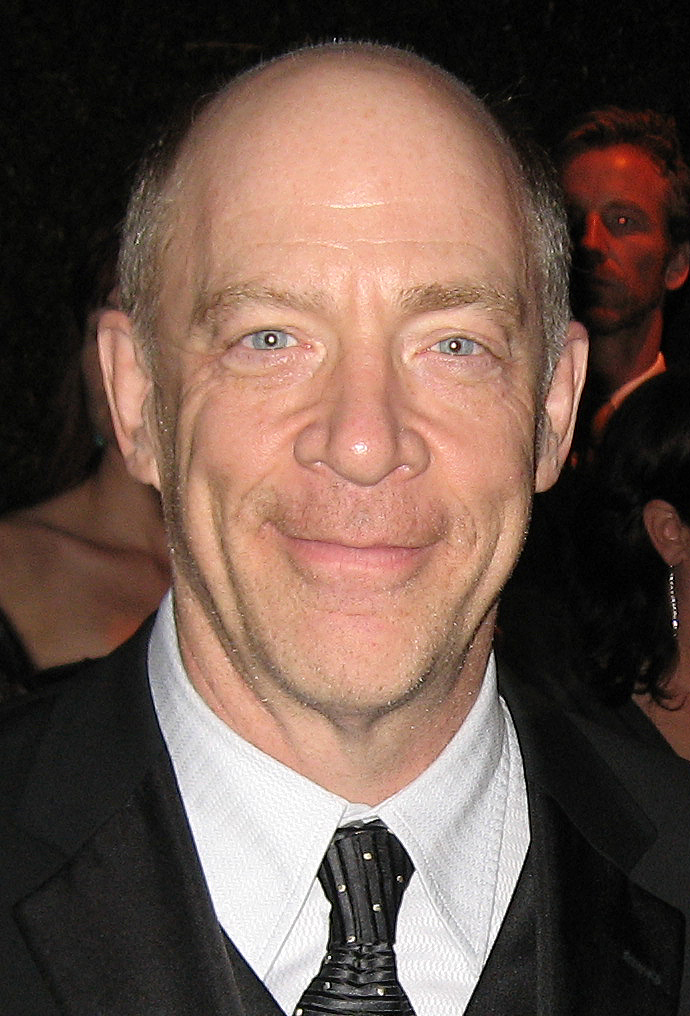
J. K. Simmons won for Whiplash.

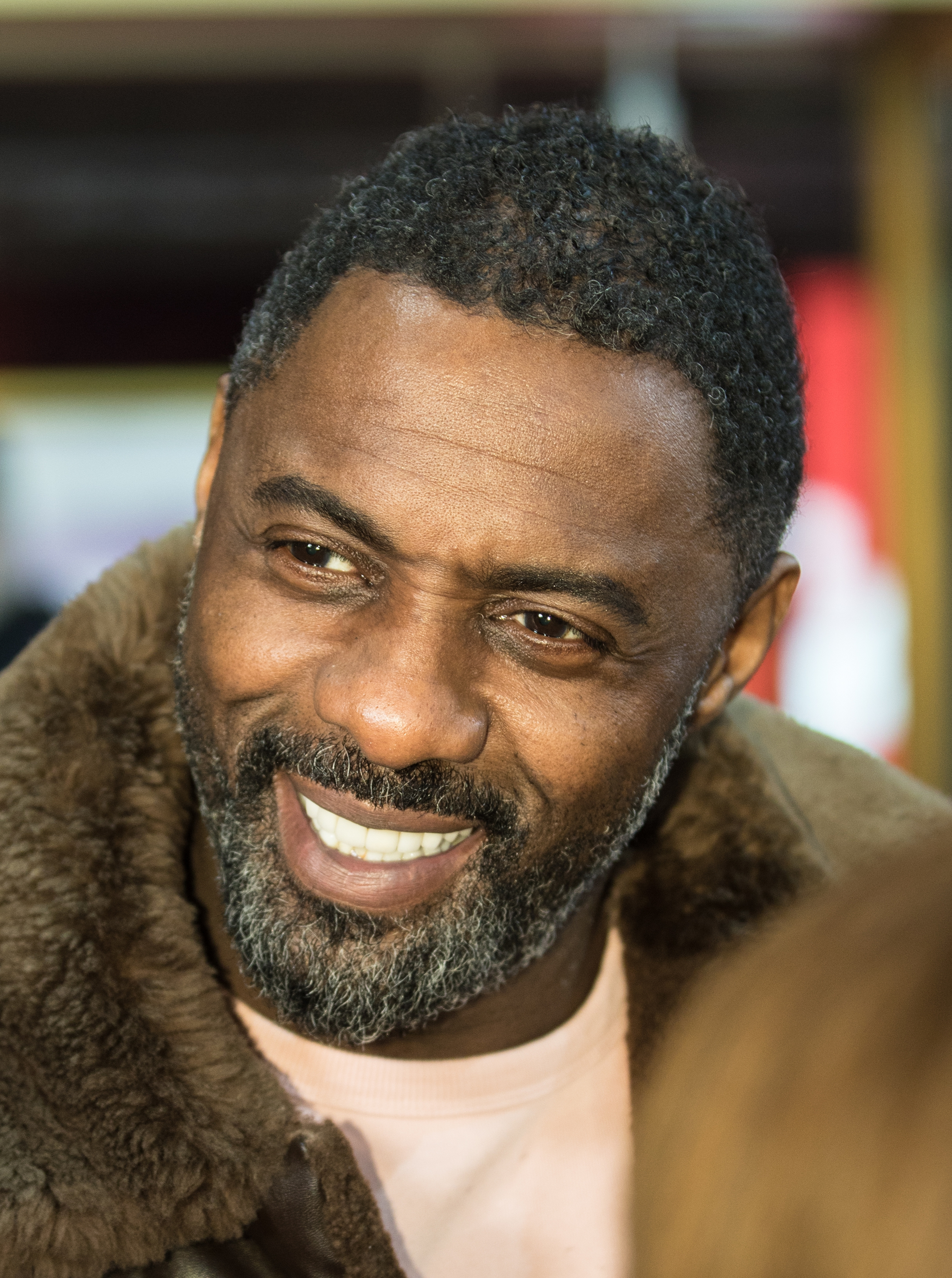
Idris Elba won for Beasts of No Nation.

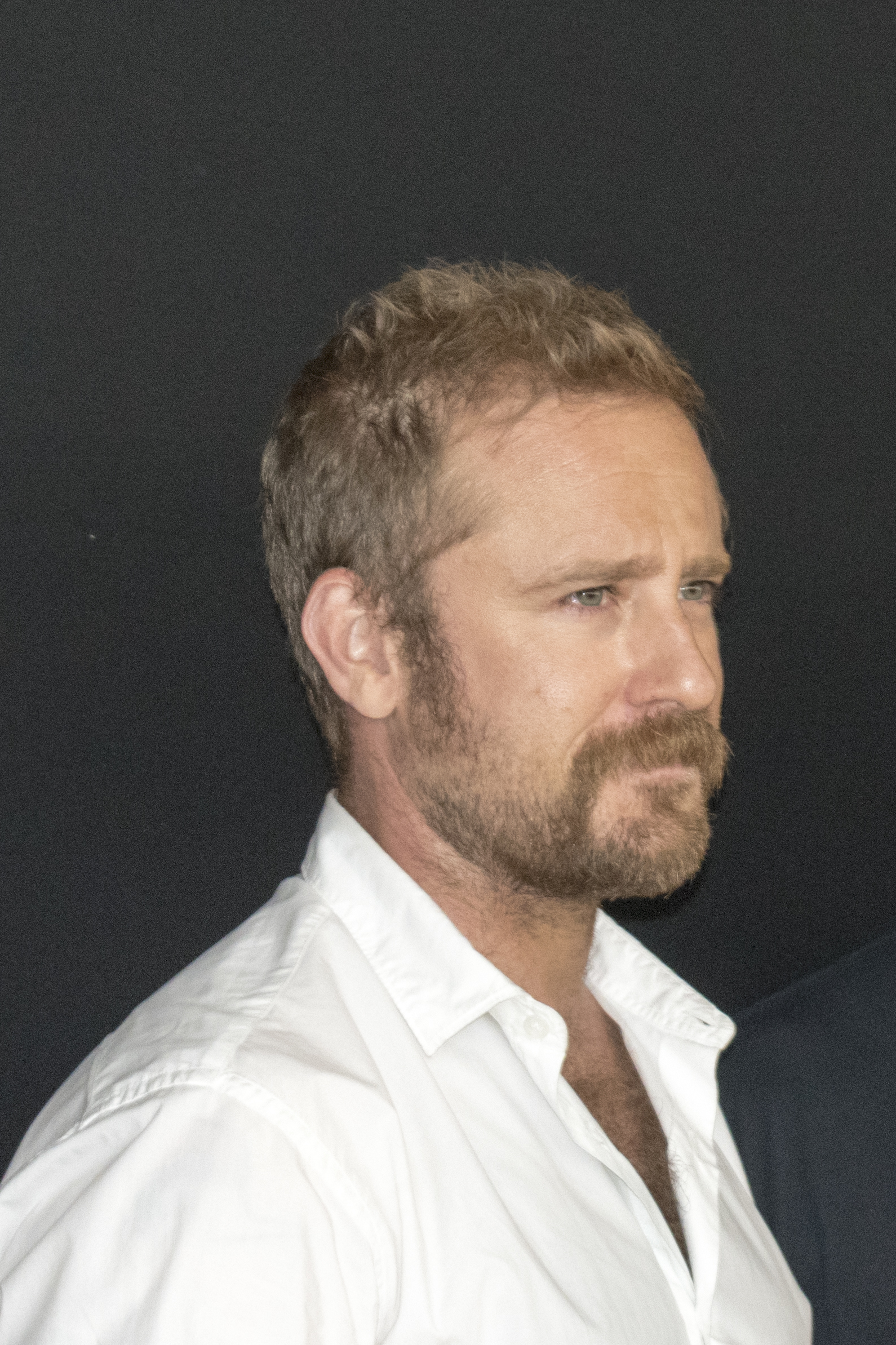
Ben Foster won for Hell or High Water.

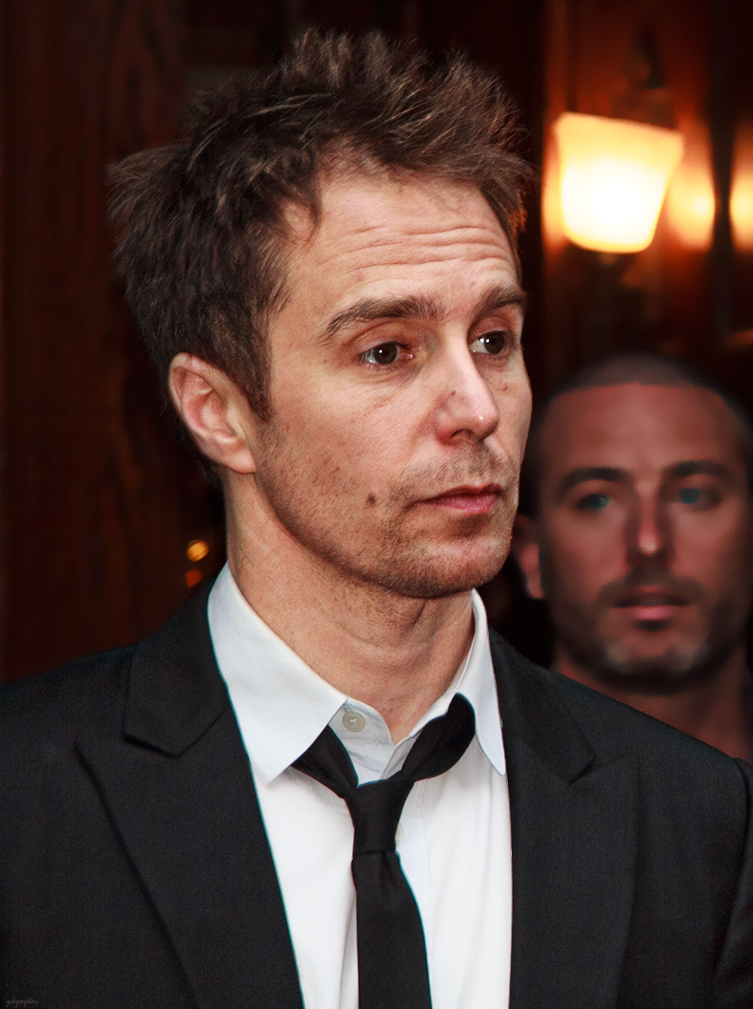
Sam Rockwell won for Three Billboards Outside Ebbing, Missouri.

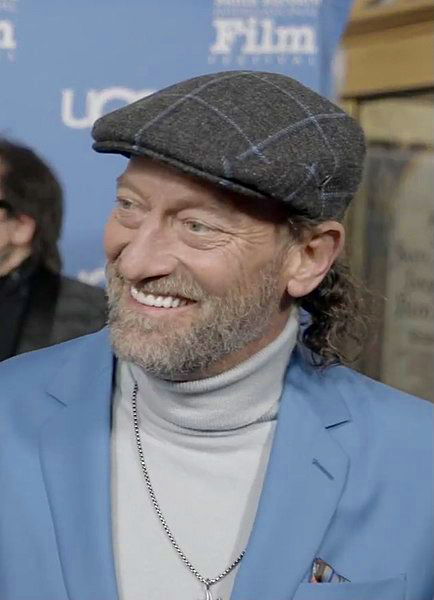
Troy Kotsur was the final recipient for CODA.

=== 1980s ===
Year	Actor	Film	Role
1987	Morgan Freeman	Street Smart	Fast Black
1987	Wings Hauser	Tough Guys Don't Dance	Capt. Alvin Luther Regency
1987	James Earl Jones	Matewan	'Few Clothes' Johnson
1987	Vincent Price	The Whales of August	Mr. Maranov
1987	David Strathairn	Matewan	Sid Hatfield
1988	Lou Diamond Phillips	Stand and Deliver	Angel Guzman
1988	Ernest Borgnine	Spike of Bensonhurst	Baldo Cacetti
1988	Divine	Hairspray	Edna Turnblad / Arvin Hodgepile
1988	John Lone	The Moderns	Bertram Stone
1988	John Turturro	Five Corners	Heinz
1989	Max Perlich	Drugstore Cowboy	David
1989	Steve Buscemi	Mystery Train	Charlie the Barber
1989	Scott Coffey	Shag	Chip Gaillard
1989	Gary Farmer	Powwow Highway	Philbert Bono
1989	Screamin' Jay Hawkins	Mystery Train	Night Clerk

=== 1990s ===
Year	Actor	Film	Role
1990	Bruce Davison	Longtime Companion	David
1990	Willem Dafoe	Wild at Heart	Bobby Peru
1990	Robin Harris	House Party	Pop
1990	Ben Lang	The Plot Against Harry	Leo
1990	Tom Towles	Henry: Portrait of a Serial Killer	Otis
1991	David Strathairn	City of Hope	Asteroid
1991	William H. Macy	Homicide	Tim Sullivan
1991	John Malkovich	Queens Logic	Eliot
1991	George T. Odom	Straight Out of Brooklyn	Ray Brown
1991	Glenn Plummer	Pastime	Tyrone Debray
1992	Steve Buscemi	Reservoir Dogs	Mr. Pink
1992	William Forsythe	The Waterdance	Bloss
1992	Jeff Goldblum	Deep Cover	David Jason
1992	Wesley Snipes	The Waterdance	Raymond Hill
1992	David Strathairn	Passion Fish	Rennie
1993	Christopher Lloyd	Twenty Bucks	Jimmy
1993	David Chung	The Ballad of Little Jo	Tinman Wong
1993	Tate Donovan	Inside Monkey Zetterland	Brent Zetterland
1993	Todd Field	Ruby in Paradise	Mike McCaslin
1993	Edward Furlong	American Heart	Nick Kelson
1994	Chazz Palminteri	Bullets Over Broadway	Cheech
1994	Giancarlo Esposito	Fresh	Esteban
1994	Larry Pine	Vanya on 42nd Street	Dr. Astrov
1994	Eric Stoltz	Pulp Fiction	Lance
1994	Nicholas Turturro	Federal Hill	Ralph
1995	Benicio del Toro	The Usual Suspects	Fred Fenster
1995	James LeGros	Living in Oblivion	Chad Palomino
1995	David Morse	The Crossing Guard	John Booth
1995	Max Perlich	Georgia	Axel Goldman
1995	Harold Perrineau	Smoke	Thomas 'Rashid' Cole
1996	Benicio del Toro	Basquiat	Benny Dalmau
1996	Kevin Corrigan	Walking and Talking	Bill
1996	Matthew Faber	Welcome to the Dollhouse	Mark Wiener
1996	Gary Farmer	Dead Man	Nobody
1996	Richard Jenkins	Flirting with Disaster	Paul Harmon
1997	Jason Lee	Chasing Amy	Banky Edwards
1997	Efrain Figueroa	Star Maps	Pepe Amato
1997	Samuel L. Jackson	Hard Eight	Jimmy
1997	Ajay Naidu	SubUrbia	Nazeer Choudhury
1997	Roy Scheider	The Myth of Fingerprints	Hal
1998	Bill Murray	Rushmore	Herman Blume
1998	James Coburn	Affliction	Glen Whitehouse
1998	Charles S. Dutton	Blind Faith	Charles Williams
1998	Gary Farmer	Smoke Signals	Arnold Joseph
1998	Philip Seymour Hoffman	Happiness	Allen
1999	Steve Zahn	Happy, Texas	Wayne Wayne Wayne Jr., aka David
1999	Charles S. Dutton	Cookie's Fortune	Jason Brown
1999	Clark Gregg	The Adventures of Sebastian Cole	Hank Rossi / Henrietta Rossi
1999	Luis Guzmán	The Limey	Eduardo Roel
1999	Terrence Howard	The Best Man	Quentin Spivey

=== 2000s ===
Year	Actor	Film	Role
2000	Willem Dafoe	Shadow of the Vampire	Max Schreck
2000	Cole Hauser	Tigerland	Staff Sgt. Cota
2000	Gary Oldman	The Contender	Shelly Runyon
2000	Giovanni Ribisi	The Gift	Buddy Cole
2000	Billy Dee Williams	The Visit	Henry
2001	Steve Buscemi	Ghost World	Seymour
2001	Don Cheadle	Things Behind the Sun	Chuck
2001	Billy Kay	L.I.E.	Gary Terrio
2001	Garrett Morris	Jackpot	Lester Irving
2001	John C. Reilly	The Anniversary Party	Mac Forsyth
2002	Dennis Quaid	Far from Heaven	Frank Whitaker
2002	Alan Arkin	Thirteen Conversations About One Thing	Gene
2002	Ray Liotta	Narc	Henry Oak
2002	John C. Reilly	The Good Girl	Phil Last
2002	Peter Weller	Ivans Xtc	Don West
2003	Djimon Hounsou	In America	Mateo
2003	Judah Friedlander	American Splendor	Toby Radloff
2003	Troy Garity	Soldier's Girl	Barry Winchell
2003	Alessandro Nivola	Laurel Canyon	Ian McKnight
2003	Peter Sarsgaard	Shattered Glass	Chuck Lane
2004	Thomas Haden Church	Sideways	Jack Cole
2004	Jon Gries	Napoleon Dynamite	Uncle Rico
2004	Aidan Quinn	Cavedweller	Clint Windsor
2004	Roger Robinson	Brother to Brother	Bruce Nugent
2004	Peter Sarsgaard	Kinsey	Clyde Martin
2005	Matt Dillon	Crash	Sgt. John Ryan
2005	Firdous Bamji	The War Within	Sayeed
2005	Jesse Eisenberg	The Squid and the Whale	Walt Berkman
2005	Barry Pepper	The Three Burials of Melquiades Estrada	Mike Norton
2005	Jeffrey Wright	Broken Flowers	Winston
2006	Alan Arkin	Little Miss Sunshine	Edwin Hoover
2006	Raymond J. Barry	Steel City	Vic Lee
2006	Daniel Craig	Infamous	Perry Smith
2006	Paul Dano	Little Miss Sunshine	Dwayne
2006	Channing Tatum	A Guide to Recognizing Your Saints	Young Antonio
2007	Chiwetel Ejiofor	Talk to Me	Dewey Hughes
2007	Marcus Carl Franklin	I'm Not There	Woody Guthrie
2007	Kene Holliday	Great World of Sound	Clarence
2007	Irrfan Khan	The Namesake	Ashoke Ganguli
2007	Steve Zahn	Rescue Dawn	Duane W. Martin
2008	James Franco	Milk	Scott Smith
2008	Anthony Mackie	The Hurt Locker	Sergeant J. T. Sanborn
2008	Charlie McDermott	Frozen River	Troy "T.J." Eddy, Jr.
2008	Jim Myron Ross	Ballast	James
2008	Haaz Sleiman	The Visitor	Tarek
2009	Woody Harrelson	The Messenger	Capt. Tony Stone
2009	Jemaine Clement	Gentlemen Broncos	Dr. Ronald Chevalier
2009	Christian McKay	Me and Orson Welles	Orson Welles
2009	Ray McKinnon	That Evening Sun	Lonzo Choat
2009	Christopher Plummer	The Last Station	Leo Tolstoy

=== 2010s ===
Year	Actor	Film	Role
2010	John Hawkes	Winter's Bone	Teardrop Dolly
2010	Samuel L. Jackson	Mother and Child	Paul
2010	Bill Murray	Get Low	Frank Quinn
2010	John Ortiz	Jack Goes Boating	Clyde
2010	Mark Ruffalo	The Kids Are All Right	Paul Hatfield
2011	Christopher Plummer	Beginners	Hal Fields
2011	Albert Brooks	Drive	Bernie Rose
2011	John Hawkes	Martha Marcy May Marlene	Patrick
2011	John C. Reilly	Cedar Rapids	Dean Ziegler
2011	Corey Stoll	Midnight in Paris	Ernest Hemingway
2012	Matthew McConaughey	Magic Mike	Dallas
2012	David Oyelowo	Middle of Nowhere	Brian
2012	Michael Peña	End of Watch	Miguel "Mike" Zavala
2012	Sam Rockwell	Seven Psychopaths	Billy Bickle
2012	Bruce Willis	Moonrise Kingdom	Captain Duffy Sharp
2013	Jared Leto	Dallas Buyers Club	Rayon
2013	Michael Fassbender	12 Years a Slave	Edwin Epps
2013	Will Forte	Nebraska	David Grant
2013	James Gandolfini	Enough Said	Albert
2013	Lakeith Stanfield	Short Term 12	Marcus
2014	J. K. Simmons	Whiplash	Terence Fletcher
2014	Riz Ahmed	Nightcrawler	Rick Blaine
2014	Ethan Hawke	Boyhood	Mason Evans, Sr.
2014	Alfred Molina	Love Is Strange	George
2014	Edward Norton	Birdman	Mike Shiner
2015	Idris Elba	Beasts of No Nation	The Commandant
2015	Kevin Corrigan	Results	Danny
2015	Paul Dano	Love & Mercy	Brian Wilson
2015	Richard Jenkins	Bone Tomahawk	Deputy Chicory
2015	Michael Shannon	99 Homes	Rick Carver
2016	Ben Foster	Hell or High Water	Tanner Howard
2016	Ralph Fiennes	A Bigger Splash	Harry Hawkes
2016	Lucas Hedges	Manchester by the Sea	Patrick Chandler
2016	Shia LaBeouf	American Honey	Jake
2016	Craig Robinson	Morris from America	Curtis Gentry
2017	Sam Rockwell	Three Billboards Outside Ebbing, Missouri	Officer Jason Dixon
2017	Nnamdi Asomugha	Crown Heights	Carl King
2017	Armie Hammer	Call Me by Your Name	Oliver
2017	Barry Keoghan	The Killing of a Sacred Deer	Martin
2017	Benny Safdie	Good Time	Nick Nikas
2018	Richard E. Grant	Can You Ever Forgive Me?	Jack Hock
2018	Raúl Castillo	We the Animals	Paps
2018	Adam Driver	BlacKkKlansman	Detective Flip Zimmerman
2018	Josh Hamilton	Eighth Grade	Mark Day
2018	John David Washington	Monsters and Men	Dennis Williams
2019	Willem Dafoe	The Lighthouse	Thomas Wake
2019	Noah Jupe	Honey Boy	Young Otis Lort
2019	Shia LaBeouf	Honey Boy	James Lort
2019	Jonathan Majors	The Last Black Man in San Francisco	Montgomery Allen
2019	Wendell Pierce	Burning Cane	Reverend Tillman

=== 2020s ===
Year	Actor	Film	Role
2020	Paul Raci	Sound of Metal	Joe
2020	Colman Domingo	Ma Rainey's Black Bottom	Cutler
2020	Orion Lee	First Cow	King-Lu
2020	Glynn Turman	Ma Rainey's Black Bottom	Toledo
2020	Benedict Wong	Nine Days	Kyo
2021	Troy Kotsur	CODA	Frank Rossi
2021	Colman Domingo	Zola	Abegunde "X" Olawale
2021	Meeko Gattuso	Queen of Glory	Pitt
2021	Will Patton	Sweet Thing	Adam
2021	Chaske Spencer	Wild Indian	Teddo

== Multiple nominees ==
2 nominations

- Alan Arkin
- Kevin Corrigan
- Paul Dano
- Colman Domingo
- Benicio del Toro
- Charles S. Dutton
- John Hawkes
- Samuel L. Jackson
- Richard Jenkins
- Shia LaBeouf
- Bill Murray
- Max Perlich
- Christopher Plummer
- Sam Rockwell
- Peter Sarsgaard
- Steve Zahn

3 nominations

- Steve Buscemi
- Willem Dafoe
- Gary Farmer
- John C. Reilly
- David Strathairn

== Multiple winners ==
2 wins

- Steve Buscemi
- Willem Dafoe
- Benicio del Toro (consecutive)

== See also ==
- Academy Award for Best Supporting Actor
- BAFTA Award for Best Actor in a Supporting Role
- Critics' Choice Movie Award for Best Supporting Actor
- Golden Globe Award for Best Supporting Actor – Motion Picture
- Screen Actors Guild Award for Outstanding Performance by a Male Actor in a Supporting Role
