= 2007 New York Film Critics Circle Awards =

73rd New York Film Critics Circle Awards

73rd NYFCC Awards

January 6, 2008

Best Picture:
No Country for Old Men

The 73rd New York Film Critics Circle Awards, honoring the best in film for 2007, were voted on 11 December 2007 and given out 6 January 2008.

== Winners ==
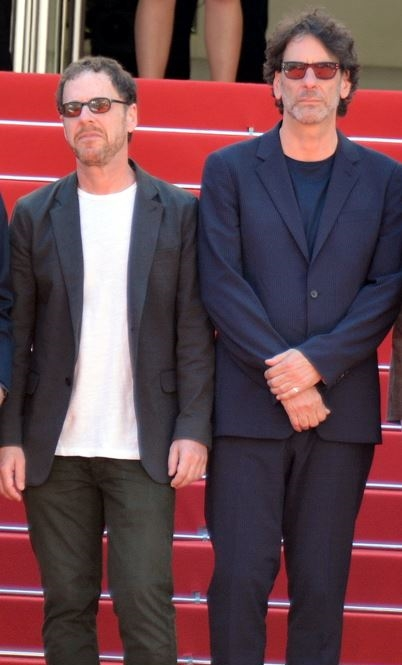
Coen brothers, Best Director and Best Screenplay winners

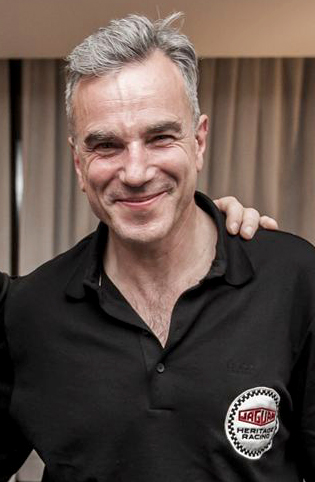
Daniel Day-Lewis, Best Actor winner

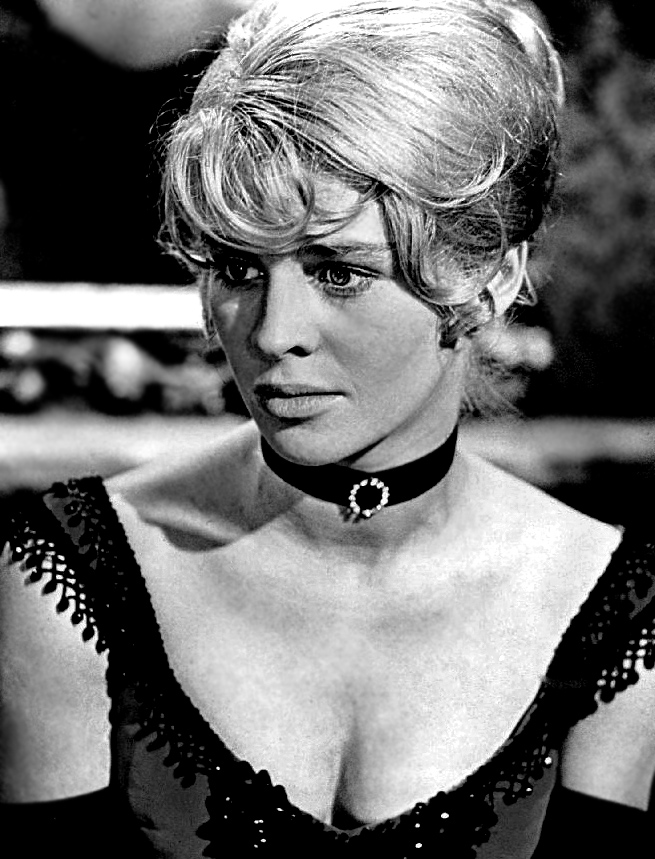
Julie Christie, Best Actress winner

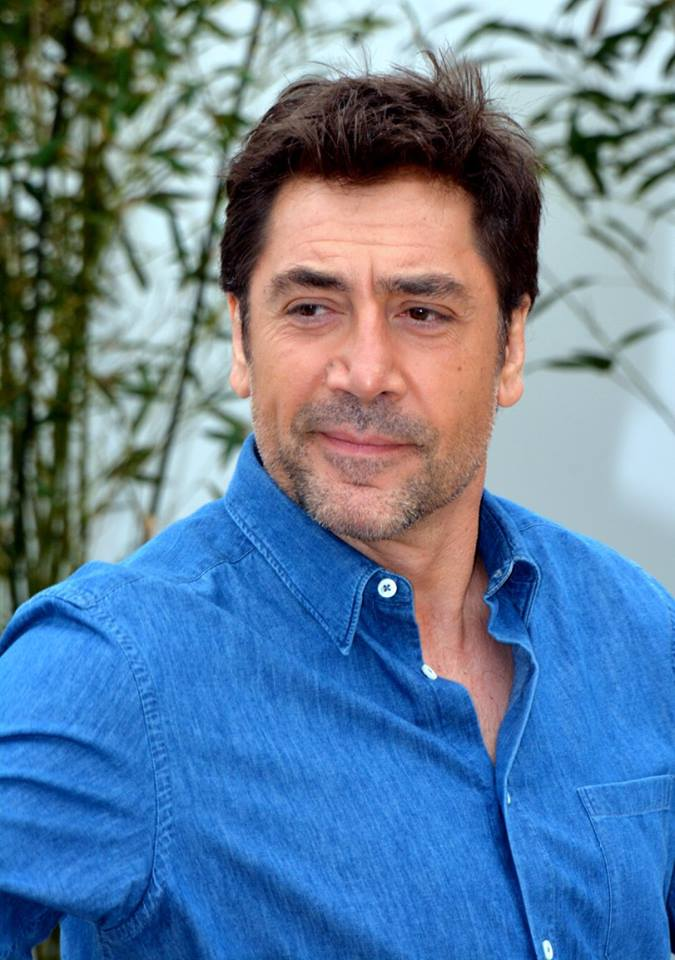
Javier Bardem, Best Supporting Actor winner

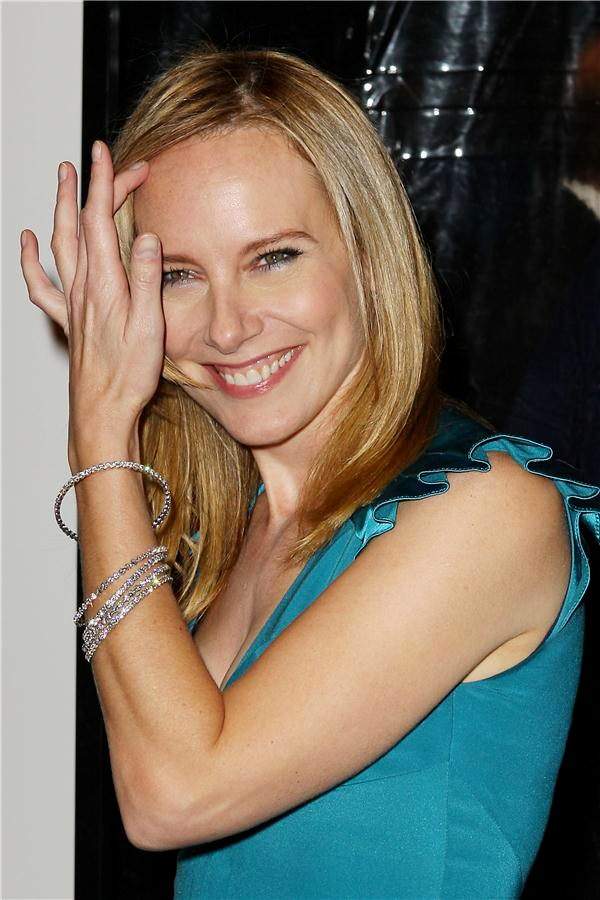
Amy Ryan, Best Supporting Actress winner

- Best Actor:
  - Daniel Day-Lewis – There Will Be Blood
  - Runner-up: Viggo Mortensen – Eastern Promises
- Best Actress:
  - Julie Christie – Away from Her
  - Runner-up: Elliot Page (Note: Credited as Ellen Page) – Juno
- Best Animated Feature:
  - Persepolis
- Best Cinematography:
  - Robert Elswit – There Will Be Blood
- Best Director:
  - Joel Coen and Ethan Coen – No Country for Old Men
  - Runners-up: Paul Thomas Anderson – There Will Be Blood and Todd Haynes – I'm Not There
- Best Film:
  - No Country for Old Men
  - Runners-up: There Will Be Blood and I'm Not There
- Best First Film:
  - Sarah Polley – Away from Her
- Best Foreign Language Film:
  - Das Leben der Anderen (The Lives of Others) • Germany
- Best Non-Fiction Film:
  - No End in Sight
- Best Screenplay:
  - Joel Coen and Ethan Coen – No Country for Old Men
  - Runners-up: Diablo Cody – Juno, Tamara Jenkins – The Savages, and James Vanderbilt – Zodiac
- Best Supporting Actor:
  - Javier Bardem – No Country for Old Men
- Best Supporting Actress:
  - Amy Ryan – Gone Baby Gone
  - Runner-up: Cate Blanchett – I'm Not There
- Lifetime Achievement:
  - Sidney Lumet
- Special Critics' Award:
  - Charles Burnett – Killer of Sheep
