= I'm Not There =

2007 musical drama film by Todd Haynes

- Theatrical release poster
- Directed by: Todd Haynes
- Screenplay by: Todd Haynes; Oren Moverman
- Story by: Todd Haynes
- Based on: The life of Bob Dylan
- Produced by: Christine Vachon; James D. Stern; John Sloss; John Goldwyn
- Starring: Christian Bale; Cate Blanchett; Marcus Carl Franklin; Richard Gere; Heath Ledger; Ben Whishaw; Charlotte Gainsbourg; David Cross; Bruce Greenwood; Julianne Moore; Michelle Williams
- Cinematography: Edward Lachman
- Edited by: Jay Rabinowitz
- Production companies: Endgame Entertainment; Killer Films; John Wells Productions; John Goldwyn Productions; VIP Medienfonds 4; Rising Star; Grey Water Park Productions
- Distributed by: The Weinstein Company (United States); Tobis Film (Germany)
- Release dates: September 3, 2007 (Venice Film Festival); November 21, 2007 (United States); February 28, 2008 (Germany)
- Running time: 135 minutes
- Countries: Germany; United States
- Language: English
- Budget: $20 million
- Box office: $11.7 million

I'm Not There is a 2007 musical drama film directed by Todd Haynes, who co-wrote the screenplay with Oren Moverman, based on a story by Haynes. An experimental biographical film, it is inspired by the life and music of American singer-songwriter Bob Dylan, with six actors depicting different facets of Dylan's public personas: Christian Bale, Cate Blanchett, Marcus Carl Franklin, Richard Gere, Heath Ledger (in his last film to be released during his lifetime), and Ben Whishaw.

A caption at the start of the film declares it to be "inspired by the music and the many lives of Bob Dylan"; this is the only mention of Dylan in the film apart from song credits, and his only appearance in it is concert footage from 1966. The film's title is taken from the 1967 Dylan Basement Tape recording of "I'm Not There", a song that had not been officially released until it appeared on the film's soundtrack album.

I'm Not There premiered at the 64th Venice International Film Festival on September 3, 2007, and was released in the United States on November 21 and in Germany on February 28, 2008. It received generally positive reviews from critics, with praise for its acting (particularly Blanchett's), directing, and musical score. It underperformed at the box office, grossing $11 million worldwide on the budget of $20 million. I'm Not There appeared on multiple publications' top ten films lists for 2007. Blanchett won the Volpi Cup for Best Actress and the Golden Globe Award for Best Supporting Actress, and received a nomination for the Academy Award for Best Supporting Actress.

== Plot ==
I'm Not There features a nonlinear narrative, shifting between six characters in separate storylines "inspired by the music and many lives of Bob Dylan". Each character represents a different facet of Dylan's public persona: poet (Arthur Rimbaud), prophet (Jack Rollins/Father John), outlaw (Billy McCarty), fake (Woody Guthrie), "rock and roll martyr" (Jude Quinn), and "star of electricity" (Robbie Clark).

Production notes published by distributor The Weinstein Company explain that the film "dramatizes the life and music of Bob Dylan as a series of shifting personae, each performed by a different actor—poet, prophet, outlaw, fake, star of electricity, rock and roll martyr, born-again Christian—six identities braided together, six organs pumping through one life story."

=== Arthur Rimbaud ===
19-year-old Arthur Rimbaud is questioned by interrogators. His cryptic responses are interspersed throughout the film, including remarks on fatalism, the nature of poets, "seven simple rules for life in hiding", and chaos.

=== Woody Guthrie ===
In 1959, a 12-year-old African-American boy (Marcus Carl Franklin) is riding the rails as a hobo. He meets two older hobos and introduces himself as Woody Guthrie. Carrying a guitar in a case bearing the slogan "this machine kills fascists", he plays blues music and sings about topics such as trade unionism. Part of a conversation on a freight train between Woody and two hobos about his life in a town called "Riddle" is directly lifted from another film, A Face in the Crowd (1957). Taken in briefly by an African American family, the mother advises him to sing about the issues of his own time instead. In another boxcar, Woody wakes to find himself menaced by other hobos and after a fight falls off the train into a river. He nearly drowns, but is rescued by a white couple who take him in. They are impressed with his musical talents, but Woody runs off when they receive a telephone call from a juvenile corrections center in Minnesota telling them he is an escaped fugitive. Upon learning that the real Woody Guthrie is deathly ill, the boy travels to New Jersey to visit Guthrie in the hospital.

=== Jack Rollins/Father John ===
The career of folk musician Jack Rollins is framed as a documentary film, told by interviewees including folk singer Alice Fabian. Jack becomes a star of the Greenwich Village folk scene in the early 1960s, praised by fans for his protest songs. He signs to Columbia Records, but in 1963, just as the Vietnam War is escalating, he stops singing protest songs and turns away from folk music, believing that neither affects real social or political change. Following the assassination of John F. Kennedy, Jack gets drunk at a ceremony where he is receiving an award from a civil rights organization. Remarking in his acceptance speech that he saw something of himself in Kennedy's assassin Lee Harvey Oswald, he is booed and derided by the audience. He goes into hiding and in 1974 enters a bible study course in Stockton, California. He emerges a born-again Christian, denouncing his past and becoming an ordained minister performing gospel music under the name "Father John."

=== Robbie Clark ===
Robbie Clark is a 22-year-old actor who plays Jack Rollins in the 1965 biographical film Grain of Sand. During filming in Greenwich Village in January 1964, he falls in love with French artist Claire, and they soon marry. Grain of Sand is a hit and Robbie becomes a star, but their relationship is strained and Claire observes Robbie flirting with other women. She is particularly offended when, during an argument in 1968 over whether the evils of the world can be changed, he opines that women can never be poets. Eventually Robbie moves out of their house, then goes to London for four months to film a thriller and has an affair with his female co-star. Richard Nixon's January 1973 announcement of the Paris Peace Accords inspires Claire to ask for a divorce. She gains custody of their two daughters, but allows Robbie to take them on a boating trip.

=== Jude Quinn ===
Jude Quinn is a former popular folk singer whose performance with a full electric band at a New England jazz and folk festival is met with outrage from his fans, who scathingly accuse him of selling out. Arriving in London, Jude is interviewed during a press conference where he wittily fields ignorant questions from journalists. At the hotel, Jude is threatened at knifepoint by an angered fan, who is eventually incapacitated after being hit with a glass. When invited personally by journalist Keenan Jones for a private interview, Jude instead frolics with the Beatles and encounters his former lover Coco Rivington, who taunts him in a surreal fashion, culminating in Jude collapsing into a coughing fit. Finally interviewing Jude, Keenan notes how Jude’s songs are being used as recruitment tools for the Black Panther Party. After a brief encounter with Allen Ginsberg, who playfully suggests that Jude “sold out to God,” Keenan opines that Jude refuses to feel deeply about anything while simultaneously being extremely self-conscious. Offended, Jude walks out of the interview. At a concert performing “Ballad of a Thin Man,” Jude is heckled and called a “Judas” by the audience, to which he calmly replies “I don’t believe you.” Keenan reveals on television that, despite Jude’s claims of a rough-and-tumble vagabond past, Jude is actually Aaron Jacob Edelstein, the suburban, middle-class, educated son of a wealthy department store owner in Brookline, Massachusetts. At the concert’s afterparty, Jude is informed by his manager Norman that he was signed up for an 83-show string of tour dates without his knowledge, much to Jude’s dismay. Spiraling into drug usage, Jude humiliates Coco at the party and berates her new lover in an inebriated manner, ending with Jude vomiting on him and being ushered out of the party. Not long after, Jude is apparently killed in a motorcycle accident, his autopsy and funeral having been shown in the beginning of the film. A final interview scene shows a solemn Jude admitting to feeling lonesome on account of the fame, muttering “everyone knows I’m not a folk singer,” before turning to the camera and softly smiling.

=== Billy McCarty ===
The outlaw Billy the Kid, believed to have been killed by Pat Garrett, lives in hiding and solitude as "Billy McCarty" in a shack outside the rural town of Riddle, Missouri. Searching for his lost dog, he has a premonition of the Vietnam War. Learning that Commissioner Garrett plans to demolish the town to build a highway, which has caused several townspeople to commit suicide, Billy rides into the centre of town and confronts Garrett, who is attempting to mollify the townsfolk. Garrett recognizes Billy but can't place him as the outlaw he supposedly killed. When the townsfolk threaten to riot, Billy is arrested by police driving modern cars and is thrown in jail for being a troublemaker. He is broken out by his friend Homer and hops a passing train. He finds Woody's guitar in the boxcar and plays it as he rides away, musing on the nature of freedom and identity.

The film concludes with footage of Dylan playing a harmonica solo during a live performance in 1966.

== Cast ==
=== Main cast ===
These six characters represent different aspects of Dylan's life and music. Some of these share names with real historical figures or artists, some are wholly fictional characters.

- Christian Bale as Jack Rollins / Pastor John
- Cate Blanchett as Jude Quinn
- Marcus Carl Franklin as Woody Guthrie
- Richard Gere as Billy the Kid
- Heath Ledger as Robbie Clark, an actor who portrays Jack Rollins in a biographical film and becomes as famous as the person he portrays
- Ben Whishaw as Arthur Rimbaud

=== Supporting cast ===
- Charlotte Gainsbourg as Claire Clark, wife of Robbie Clark
- David Cross as Allen Ginsberg
- Eugene Brotto as Peter Orlovsky
- Bruce Greenwood as Keenan Jones, a fictional reporter who investigates Jude Quinn, and Pat Garrett, nemesis of Billy the Kid.
- Julianne Moore as Alice Fabian, a singer
- Michelle Williams as Coco Rivington
- Mark Camacho as Norman, the manager of Jude Quinn
- Benz Antoine as Bobby Seale, the Black Panther leader, and Rabbit Brown
- Craig Thomas as Huey Newton, the Black Panther leader
- Richie Havens as Old Man Arvin
- Kim Roberts as Mrs. Arvin
- Kris Kristofferson as The Narrator
- Don Francks as Hobo Joe
- Vito DeFilippo and Susan Glover as Mr. and Mrs. Peacock, a middle-class couple who take "Woody Guthrie" in after a near-drowning incident
- Paul Spence as Homer, Billy the Kid's friend

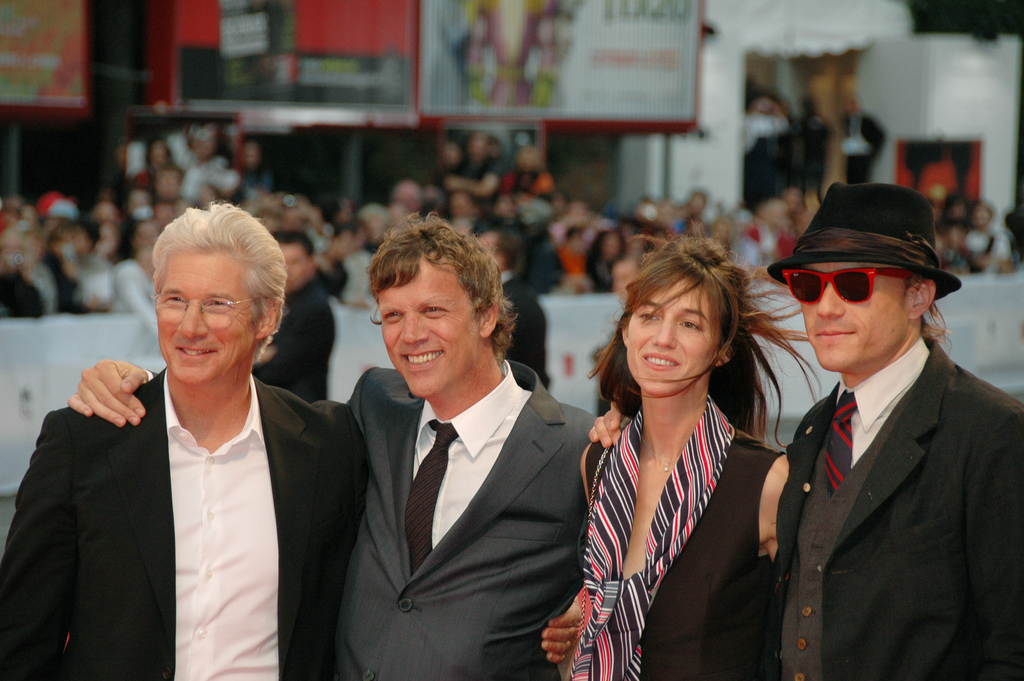
Richard Gere, Todd Haynes, Charlotte Gainsbourg and Heath Ledger at the 64th Venice International Film Festival, September 2007

== Production ==
=== Development ===
Todd Haynes and his producer, Christine Vachon, approached Dylan's manager, Jeff Rosen, to obtain permission to use Dylan's music and to fictionalize elements of Dylan's life. Rosen suggested that Haynes should send a one-page synopsis of his film for submission to Dylan. Rosen advised Haynes not to use the word "genius" or "voice of a generation". The page Haynes submitted began with a quote from Arthur Rimbaud: "I is someone else", and then continued:

If a film were to exist in which the breadth and flux of a creative life could be experienced, a film that could open up, as opposed to consolidating, what we think we already know walking in, it could never be within the tidy arc of a master narrative. The structure of such a film would have to be a fractured one, with numerous openings and a multitude of voices, with its prime strategy being one of refraction, not condensation. Imagine a film splintered between six separate faces – old men, young men, women, children – each standing in for spaces in a single life.

Dylan gave Haynes permission to proceed with his project. Haynes developed his screenplay with writer Oren Moverman. In the course of writing, Haynes has acknowledged that he became uncertain whether he could successfully carry off a film which deliberately confused biography with fantasy in such an extreme way. According to the account of the film that Robert Sullivan published in the New York Times: "Haynes called Jeff Rosen, Dylan's right hand, who was watching the deal-making but staying out of the scriptwriting. Rosen, he said, told him not to worry, that it was just his own crazy version of what Dylan is."

In a comment on why six actors were employed to portray different facets of Dylan's personality, Haynes wrote:

The minute you try to grab hold of Dylan, he's no longer where he was. He's like a flame: If you try to hold him in your hand you'll surely get burned. Dylan's life of change and constant disappearances and constant transformations makes you yearn to hold him, and to nail him down. And that's why his fan base is so obsessive, so desirous of finding the truth and the absolutes and the answers to him – things that Dylan will never provide and will only frustrate. ... Dylan is difficult and mysterious and evasive and frustrating, and it only makes you identify with him all the more as he skirts identity.

A further Dylan-based character named Charlie, based on Charlie Chaplin, was dropped before filming began. Haynes described him as "a little tramp, coming to Greenwich Village and performing feats of magic and being an arbiter of peace between the beats and the folkies". Actors including Adrien Brody and Colin Farrell were attached to play characters representing Dylan early in development; Heath Ledger replaced the latter, who dropped out for undisclosed reasons, as Robbie Clark.

=== Grain of Sand ===
The film within a film, Grain of Sand, is not only important for the plot of I'm Not There but also for the film's connection to Bob Dylan's life. Larry Gross suggests that Grain of Sand actor Robbie may be the film's most accurate portrayal of Dylan despite being "a fictional actor playing a fictional alternative version of a real person" because of his tumultuous relationship with Claire. Gross also notes parallels between Robbie and Claire's ultimately failed marriage and Dylan's relationship with Suze Rotolo, claiming that Claire's character seems to be a portrayal of Rotolo, especially considering the shot in I'm Not There that mimics the photo of Rotolo and Dylan on the cover of The Freewheelin' Bob Dylan.

=== Filming ===
Principal photography took place in Montreal, Quebec, Canada. Music festival scenes were filmed in Chambly, Quebec in the summer of 2006.

=== Music ===
The film features numerous songs by Dylan, performed by Dylan and also recordings by other artists. The songs feature as both foreground—performed by artists on camera (e.g. "Goin' to Acapulco", "Pressing On")—and background accompaniment to the action. A notable non-Dylan song in the movie is "(I'm Not Your) Steppin' Stone" by The Monkees, which plays in the background of a party scene set in London.

== Release and reception ==
In May 2005, Sony Pictures Classics was reportedly in negotiations to acquire North and Latin American and Spanish distribution rights to the film. In January 2007, The Weinstein Company acquired North American and U.K. distribution rights to the film. I'm Not There had its world premiere at the Telluride Film Festival on August 31, 2007. The film went onto screen at the Toronto International Film Festival, London Film Festival, and the New York Film Festival. It opened in limited release in the United States on November 21, 2007. It was then released in Germany on February 28, 2008, by Tobis Film.

=== Home media ===
I'm Not There was released on DVD as a 2-disc special edition on May 6, 2008. The DVD special features include audio commentary from Haynes, deleted scenes, featurettes, a music video, audition tapes for certain cast members, trailers, and a Bob Dylan filmography and discography.

=== Critical response ===
I'm Not There received generally positive reviews from critics. On review aggregator website Rotten Tomatoes, the film has a 76% approval rating based on 161 reviews, with an average rating of 7.7/10. The site's critical consensus states: "I'm Not There's unique editing, visuals, and multiple talented actors portraying Bob Dylan make for a deliciously unconventional experience. Each segment brings a new and fresh take on Dylan's life." On Metacritic, the film has a weighted average score of 73 out of 100, based on 35 critics, indicating "generally favorable" reviews.

Writing in The Chronicle of Higher Education, Anthony DeCurtis wrote that casting six different actors, including a woman and an African-American child, to play Dylan was "a preposterous idea, the sort of self-consciously 'audacious'—or reassuringly multi-culti—gambit that, for instance, doomed the Broadway musical based on the life and music of John Lennon. Yet in I'm Not There, the strategy works brilliantly." He especially praised Blanchett:

Her performance is a wonder, and not simply because, as Jude Quinn, she inhabits the twitchy, amphetamine-fired Dylan of 1965–66 with unnerving accuracy. Casting a woman in this role reveals a dimension to the acerbic Dylan of this era that has rarely been noted ... Blanchett's translucent skin, delicate fingers, slight build, and pleading eyes all suggest the previously invisible vulnerability and fear that fueled Dylan's lacerating anger. It's hard to imagine that any male actor, or any less-gifted female actor for that matter, could have lent such rich texture to the role.

Several other critics also praised Blanchett's performance as the mid-1960s Dylan. Newsweek magazine described Blanchett as "so convincing and intense that you shrink back in your seat when she fixes you with her gaze." The Charlotte Observer called Blanchett "miraculously close to the 1966 Dylan."

Todd McCarthy of Variety, concluded that the film was well-made, but was ultimately a speciality event for Dylan fans, with little mainstream appeal. He wrote: "Dylan freaks and scholars will have the most fun with I'm Not There, and there will inevitably be innumerable dissertations on the ways Haynes has both reflected and distorted reality, mined and manipulated the biographical record and otherwise had a field day with the essentials, as well as the esoterica, of Dylan's life. All of this will serve to inflate the film's significance by ignoring its lack of more general accessibility. In the end, it's a specialists' event." For Roger Ebert, the film was enjoyable cinematically, yet never sought to resolve the enigmas of Dylan's life and work: "Coming away from I'm Not There, we have, first of all, heard some great music ... We've seen six gifted actors challenged by playing facets of a complete man. We've seen a daring attempt at biography as collage. We've remained baffled by the Richard Gere cowboy sequence, which doesn't seem to know its purpose. And we have been left not one step closer to comprehending Bob Dylan, which is as it should be."

=== Dylan's response ===
In September 2012, Dylan commented on I'm Not There in an interview published in Rolling Stone. When journalist Mikal Gilmore asked Dylan whether he liked the film, he responded: "Yeah, I thought it was all right. Do you think that the director was worried that people would understand it or not? I don't think he cared one bit. I just think he wanted to make a good movie. I thought it looked good, and those actors were incredible."

=== Top ten lists ===
The film appeared on several critics' lists of the top ten films of 2007.

- 1st – J. Hoberman, The Village Voice
- 1st – Owen Gleiberman, Entertainment Weekly
- 1st – Stephanie Zacharek, Salon
- 1st – Ty Burr, The Boston Globe
- 3rd – Lisa Schwarzbaum, Entertainment Weekly
- 3rd – Marc Mohan, The Oregonian
- 4th – A. O. Scott, The New York Times
- 4th – Nathan Lee, The Village Voice
- 4th – Shawn Levy, The Oregonian
- 5th – Steven Rea, The Philadelphia Inquirer
- 6th – Kevin Crust, Los Angeles Times
- 7th – Marjorie Baumgarten, The Austin Chronicle
- 9th – Glenn Kenny, Premiere
- 9th – Peter Travers, Rolling Stone
- 10th – Ann Hornaday, The Washington Post
- 10th – Desson Thomson, The Washington Post
- 10th – Keith Phipps, The A.V. Club
- 10th – Tasha Robinson, The A.V. Club

=== Accolades ===
- Academy Awards:
  - Best Supporting Actress (Cate Blanchett, nominee)
- British Academy Film Awards
  - Best Actress in a Supporting Role (Cate Blanchett, nominee)
- Broadcast Film Critics:
  - Best Supporting Actress (Cate Blanchett, nominee)
- Central Ohio Film Critics:
  - Best Supporting Actress (Cate Blanchett, winner)
- Chicago Film Critics:
  - Best Supporting Actress (Cate Blanchett, winner)
- Golden Globe Awards:
  - Best Supporting Actress (Cate Blanchett, winner)
- Independent Spirit Awards
  - Best Film (nominee)
  - Best Director (Todd Haynes, nominee)
  - Best Supporting Actor (Marcus Carl Franklin, nominee)
  - Best Supporting Actress (Cate Blanchett, winner)
  - Robert Altman Award (Todd Haynes, Laura Rosenthal, Christian Bale, Cate Blanchett, Marcus Carl Franklin, Charlotte Gainsbourg, Richard Gere, Bruce Greenwood, Heath Ledger and Ben Whishaw, winner)
- Las Vegas Film Critics:
  - Best Supporting Actress (Cate Blanchett, winner)
- Los Angeles Film Critics:
  - Best Supporting Actress (Cate Blanchett, runner-up)
- New York Film Critics Circle:
  - Best Supporting Actress (Cate Blanchett, runner-up)
- New York Film Critics Online:
  - Best Supporting Actress (Cate Blanchett, winner)
- National Society of Film Critics:
  - Best Supporting Actress (Cate Blanchett, winner)
- Nilsson Awards for Film
  - Best Supporting Actress (Cate Blanchett, winner)
  - Best Cinematography
  - Best Compiled Soundtrack
- Satellite Awards:
  - Best Actress – Comedy or Musical (Cate Blanchett, nominee)
- Screen Actors Guild (SAG):
  - Best Supporting Actress (Cate Blanchett, nominee)
- Southeastern Film Critics:
  - Best Supporting Actress (Cate Blanchett, runner-up)
- Venice Film Festival:
  - Golden Lion (Todd Haynes, nominee)
  - Special Jury Prize (Todd Haynes, winner)
  - Volpi Cup Best Actress (Cate Blanchett, winner)

== Correlations to Dylan's life ==
The character of Jack Rollins depicts Dylan during his acoustic, "protest" phase which includes The Freewheelin' Bob Dylan and The Times They Are a-Changin'. Rollins's speech mentioning Lee Harvey Oswald quotes from a speech Dylan made when receiving the Tom Paine Award from the National Emergency Civil Liberties Committee in December 1963. Pastor John embodies Dylan's "born-again" period when he recorded Slow Train Coming and Saved.

Jude Quinn "closely follows Dylan's mid-sixties adventures" and his "dangerous game propels him into existential breakdown." Quinn is an embodiment of Dylan in 1965–66, when he controversially played electric guitar at the Newport Folk Festival, toured the UK with a band and was booed. Quinn is seen at a folk festival performing a rock version of "Maggie's Farm" to outraged folk music fans; Dylan performed this song at the Newport Folk Festival in 1965, which provoked booing and controversy. Some of the questions Quinn is asked at a London press conference are quotes from Dylan's KQED press conference in San Francisco in December 1965. The sped-up film speed in the scene of Quinn gambolling with The Beatles echoes the style of Richard Lester's depiction in A Hard Day's Night. Quinn's reply, "How can I answer that if you've got the nerve to ask me?", to Bruce Greenwood's character comes from a similar response Dylan made to a reporter from Time magazine in Dont Look Back, Pennebaker's documentary about Dylan's 1965 English tour. The scene in which Jude is called "Judas" by an audience member is based on a May 17, 1966, concert in Manchester, captured on Dylan's album Live 1966. The Jude Quinn character's death reflects a serious motorcycle accident Dylan had in 1966.

The Woody character refers to Dylan's youthful obsession with folk singer Woody Guthrie. The slogan "This machine kills fascists" on Woody's guitar case mimics a label Guthrie famously had on his guitar.

Billy the Kid refers to Dylan playing the role of Alias in Sam Peckinpah's 1973 western Pat Garrett and Billy the Kid. Billy's final monologue in the film echoes remarks Dylan made in a 1997 interview with David Gates of Newsweek: "I don't think I'm tangible to myself. I mean, I think one thing today and I think another thing tomorrow. I change during the course of a day. I wake and I'm one person, and when I go to sleep I know for certain I'm somebody else. I don't know who I am most of the time. It doesn't even matter to me."

The character Robbie Clark is an actor who portrays Jack Rollins in a biographical film and becomes as famous as the person he portrays; he experiences the stresses of a disintegrating marriage, reflecting Dylan's personal life around the time of 1975's Blood on the Tracks. The scene in which Robbie and Claire run romantically through the streets of New York re-enacts the cover of the 1963 album The Freewheelin' Bob Dylan which depicts Dylan arm in arm with his then-girlfriend Suze Rotolo in Greenwich Village. Dylan was divorced from his first wife, Sara Dylan, in June 1977 and the divorce involved court battles over the custody of their children. In his production notes, Haynes wrote that Robbie and Claire's relationship is "doomed to a long stubborn protraction (not unlike Vietnam, which it parallels)." Claire Clark, the wife of Robbie Clark, is a representation of Sara Dylan and Suze Rotolo.

Arthur Rimbaud is depicted as a man being questioned and responding with quotes from Dylan's interviews and writings. Dylan wrote in his autobiography Chronicles that he was influenced by Rimbaud's outlook.

Keenan Jones, the name of the fictional reporter who investigates Jude Quinn and Pat Garrett, echoes Dylan's song "Ballad of a Thin Man" with its chorus: "Something is happening here/ And you don't know what it is, do you Mr. Jones?" The character's revelation of Jude's past is based on a hostile profile of Dylan published in the October 1963 issue of Newsweek, revealing that he was originally named Robert Zimmerman and implying that he had lied about his middle-class origins.

The character Alice Fabian is a singer who resembles folk singer Joan Baez.

The description of Coco Rivington as "Andy's new bird" suggests this character is modelled on Edie Sedgwick, a socialite and actress within Andy Warhol's circle.

Norman, the manager of Jude Quinn, is based on Albert Grossman, Dylan's manager until 1970.

Huey Newton depicts the real-life Black Panther leader. He and Bobby Seale, another Black Panther leader, listened "obsessively" to Dylan's song "Ballad of a Thin Man" while putting together the first issue of the Black Panther newspaper in 1967.

== See also ==
- A Complete Unknown, a 2024 Dylan biopic directed by James Mangold
- List of actors nominated for multiple Academy Awards in the same year

== Sources ==
- "Blanchett wins top Venice award". BBC News Online. September 8, 2007.
- "Coppa Volpi for best actors since 1935". La Biennale di Venezia.
- Dylan, Bob (2004). Chronicles: Volume One. Simon and Schuster. ISBN 0-7432-2815-4.
- Ebert, Roger (November 21, 2007). "I'm Not There". Rogerebert.com. Archived from the original on October 13, 2012.
- Gates, David (October 6, 1997). "Dylan Revisited". Newsweek. Archived from the original on September 24, 2011.
- Gates, David (November 7, 2007). "'Full-on Rave' for Dylan Film". Newsweek.
- Gibron, Bill (May 7, 2008). "I'm Not There: Two-Disc Collector's Edition". DVD talk.
- Gilmore, Mikal (September 27, 2012). "Bob Dylan Unleashed: A Wild Ride on His New LP and Striking Back at Critics". Rolling Stone.
- Gray, Michael (2006). The Bob Dylan Encyclopedia. Continuum International. ISBN 0-8264-6933-7.
- Hardy, Dominique (August 29, 2006). "Tournage du film I'm Not There: Chambly en vedette". Journal de Chambly (in French). Archived from the original on April 13, 2014.
- Hedin, Benjamin, ed. (2004). Studio A: The Bob Dylan Reader. W.W.Norton & Co. ISBN 0-393-32742-6.
- Heylin, Clinton (1996). Bob Dylan: A Life In Stolen Moments. Book Sales. ISBN 0-7119-5669-3.
- Heylin, Clinton (2003). Bob Dylan: Behind the Shades Revisited. Perennial Currents. ISBN 0-06-052569-X.
- Hoberman, J. (November 13, 2007). "Like a Complete Unknown: I'm Not There and the Changing Face of Bob Dylan on Film". The Village Voice. Archived from the original on March 24, 2014.
- Lee, C.P. (2000). Like a Bullet of Light: The Films of Bob Dylan. Helter Skelter. ISBN 1-900924-06-4.
- Male, Andrew (December 6, 2007). "Dylan Director Comes Clean". Mojo. Archived from the original on December 31, 2007.
- McCarthy, Todd (September 4, 2007). "Review: I'm Not There". Variety.
- "Metacritic: 2007 Film Critic Top Ten Lists". Metacritic. Archived from the original on January 2, 2008.
- "Oscar Legacy: The 80th Academy Awards (2008) Nominees and Winners". The Academy of Motion Picture Arts and Sciences. Archived from the original on October 6, 2014.
- Pennebaker, D.A. (2006). Dont Look Back. New Video Group Inc. ISBN 0-7670-9157-4.
- Shelton, Robert (1986). No Direction Home: The Life and Music of Bob Dylan (2003 ed.). Da Copa Press. ISBN 0-306-81287-8.
- Sullivan, Robert (October 7, 2007). "This Is Not a Bob Dylan Movie". The New York Times.
- Unterberger, Richie (February 26, 2007). "Interview with Joe Boyd". Richieunterberger.com.
- The Weinstein Company (September 1, 2007). "I'm Not There: Production Notes". twcpublicity.com. Archived from the original on December 8, 2013.
- Travers, Peter (December 19, 2007). "Peter Travers' Best and Worst Movies of 2007: 9. I'm Not There". Rolling Stone. Archived from the original on December 23, 2007.
