= 23rd Independent Spirit Awards =

Ceremony held in 2008, honoring the films of 2007

- Date: February 23, 2008
- Site: U.S.
- Hosted by: Rainn Wilson

Highlights
- Best Film: Juno
- Most awards: Juno (3)
- Most nominations: Juno (4); The Diving Bell and the Butterfly (4); I'm Not There (4); The Savages (4)

The 23rd Independent Spirit Awards, honoring the best in independent filmmaking for 2007, were announced on February 23, 2008. It was hosted by Rainn Wilson.

== Winners and nominees ==
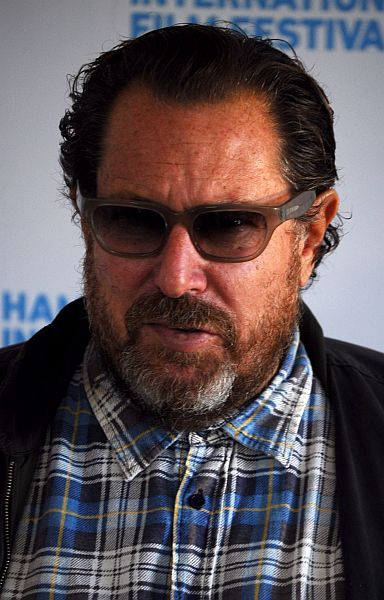
Julian Schnabel, Best Director winner

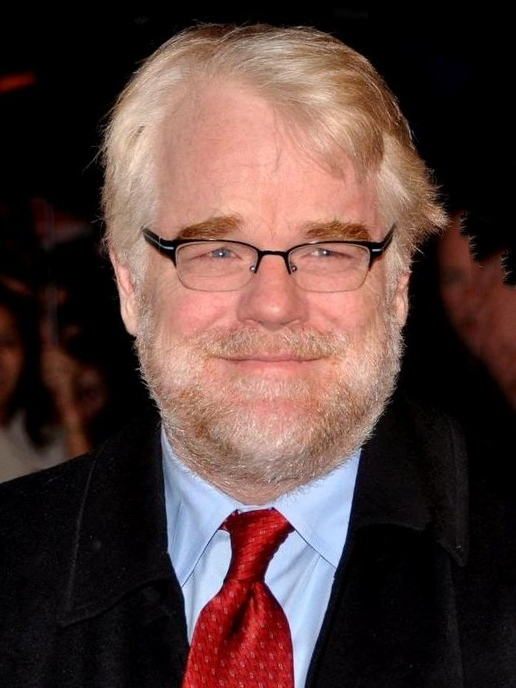
Philip Seymour Hoffman, Best Male Lead winner

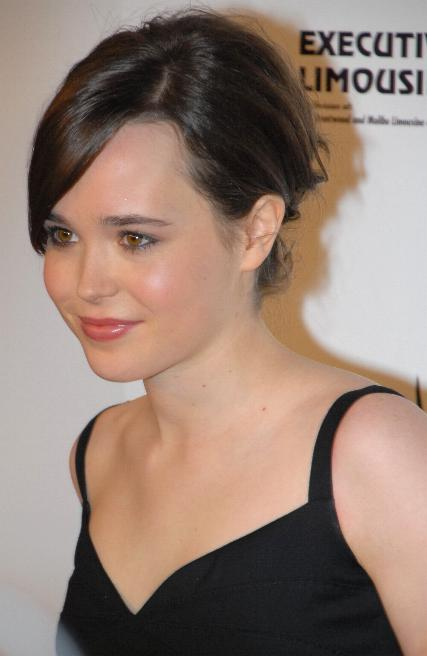
Elliot Page, Best Female Lead winner

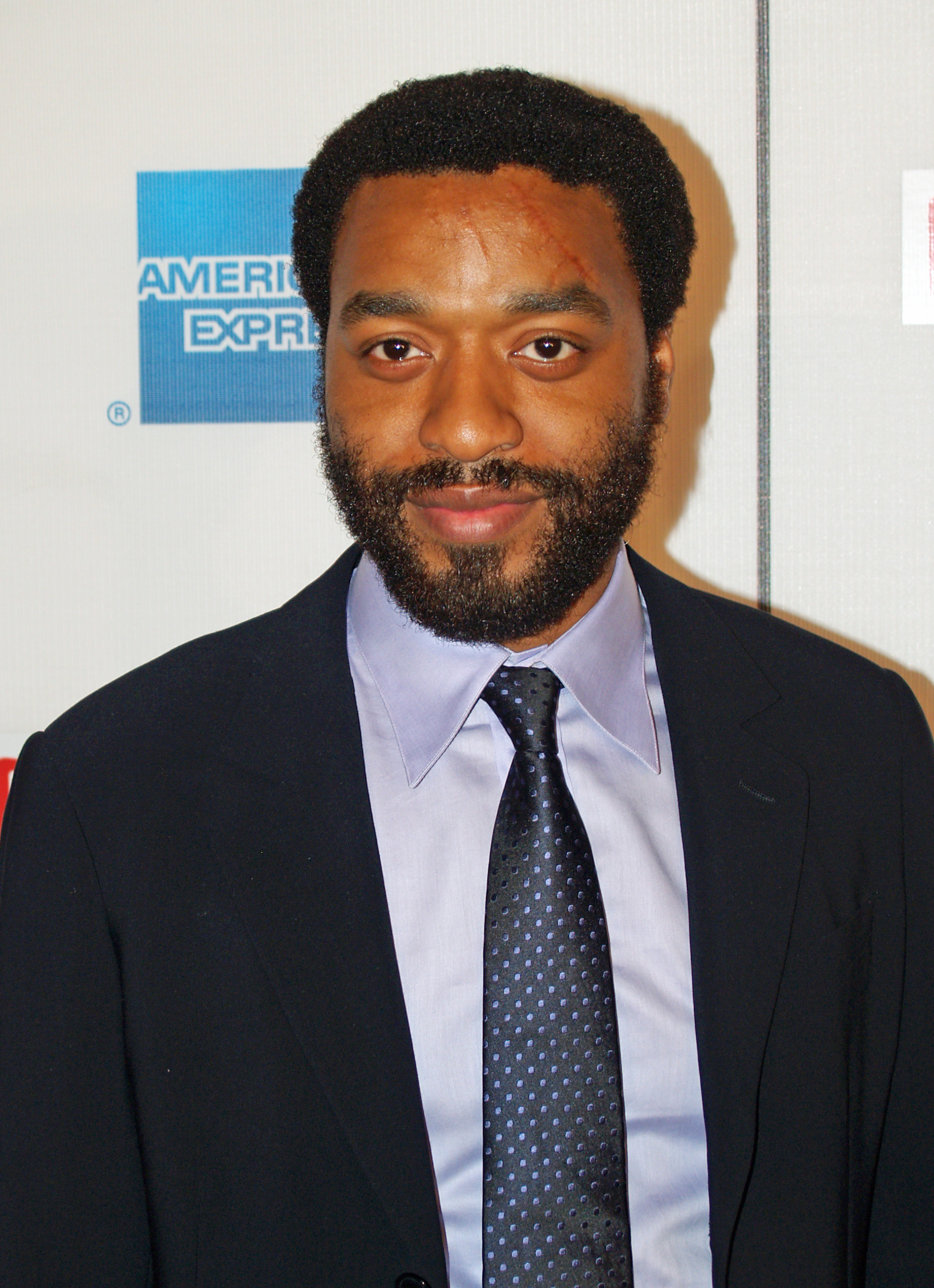
Chiwetel Ejiofor, Best Supporting Male winner

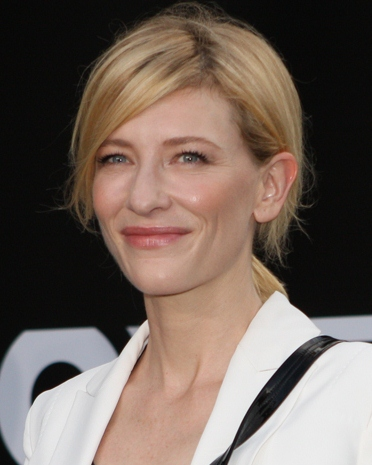
Cate Blanchett, Best Supporting Female winner

Best Feature	Best Director
Juno: The Diving Bell and the Butterfly; I'm Not There; A Mighty Heart; Paranoid Park	Julian Schnabel – The Diving Bell and the Butterfly: Todd Haynes – I'm Not There; Tamara Jenkins – The Savages; Jason Reitman – Juno; Gus Van Sant – Paranoid Park
Best Male Lead	Best Female Lead
Philip Seymour Hoffman – The Savages: Pedro Castaneda – August Evening; Don Cheadle – Talk to Me; Frank Langella – Starting Out in the Evening; Tony Leung – Lust, Caution	Elliot Page – Juno: Angelina Jolie – A Mighty Heart; Sienna Miller – Interview; Parker Posey – Broken English; Tang Wei – Lust, Caution
Best Supporting Male	Best Supporting Female
Chiwetel Ejiofor – Talk to Me: Marcus Carl Franklin – I'm Not There; Kene Holliday – Great World of Sound; Irrfan Khan – The Namesake; Steve Zahn – Rescue Dawn	Cate Blanchett – I'm Not There: Anna Kendrick – Rocket Science; Jennifer Jason Leigh – Margot at the Wedding; Tamara Podemski – Four Sheets to the Wind; Marisa Tomei – Before the Devil Knows You're Dead
Best Screenplay	Best First Screenplay
The Savages – Tamara Jenkins: The Diving Bell and the Butterfly – Ronald Harwood; Starting Out in the Evening – Fred Parnes and Andrew Wagner; Waitress – Adrienne Shelly; Year of the Dog – Mike White	Juno – Diablo Cody: Before the Devil Knows You're Dead – Kelly Masterson; Broken English – Zoe Cassavetes; A Mighty Heart – John Orloff; Rocket Science – Jeffrey Blitz
Best First Feature	Best Documentary
The Lookout: 2 Days in Paris; Great World of Sound; Rocket Science; Vanaja	Crazy Love: Lake of Fire; Manufactured Landscapes; The Monastery; The Prisoner or: How I Planned to Kill Tony Blair
Best Cinematography	Best Foreign Film
The Diving Bell and the Butterfly – Janusz Kamiński: Lust, Caution – Rodrigo Prieto; The Savages – W. Mott Hupfel III; Vanaja – Milton Kam; Youth Without Youth – Mihai Mălaimare Jr.	Once • Ireland: 4 Months, 3 Weeks and 2 Days • Romania; The Band's Visit • Israel; Lady Chatterley • France; Persepolis • France

=== Films with multiple nominations and awards ===
Films that received multiple nominations
Nominations	Film
4	Juno
4	The Diving Bell and the Butterfly
4	I'm Not There
4	The Savages
3	A Mighty Heart
3	Lust, Caution
2	Before the Devil Knows You're Dead
2	Broken English
2	Great World of Sound
2	Paranoid Park
2	Rocket Science
2	Starting Out in the Evening
2	Talk to Me

Films that won multiple awards
Awards	Film
3	Juno
2	The Diving Bell and the Butterfly
2	The Savages

== Special awards ==
=== John Cassavetes Award ===
August Evening

- Owl and the Sparrow
- The Pool
- Quiet City
- Shotgun Stories

=== Truer Than Fiction Award ===
The Unforeseen

- Helvetica
- Running Stumbled

=== Producers Award ===
Neil Kopp – Paranoid Park and Old Joy

- Alexis Ferris – Cthulhu and Police Beat
- Anne Clements – Ping Pong Playa and Quinceañera

=== Someone to Watch Award ===
Ramin Bahrani – Chop Shop

- Ronald Bronstein – Frownland
- Lee Isaac Chung – Munyurangabo

=== Robert Altman Award ===
(*Note: This award is given to its director, casting director, and ensemble cast)

- I'm Not There (Todd Haynes, Laura Rosenthal, Christian Bale, Cate Blanchett, Marcus Carl Franklin, Charlotte Gainsbourg, Richard Gere, Bruce Greenwood, Heath Ledger and Ben Whishaw)
