= Anne Turyn =

American photographer

- Born: 1954 (age 71–72)
- Education: Antioch College (BFA); Graduate Center, CUNY (M.A.); University at Buffalo (M.F.A.)
- Occupation: Photographer
- Website: anneturyn.com

Anne Turyn (born 1954) is an American photographer. Her work is included in the collections of the Whitney Museum of American Art, the Metropolitan Museum of Art and the Museum of Modern Art, New York. She is also an adjunct professor at the Pratt Institute in Brooklyn, New York.

Turyn founded and edited Top Stories between 1978 and 1991—"experimental fiction written by (mostly) women authors, styled as chapbooks with each issue dedicated to a single writer."

== Career ==
Turyn graduated from Antioch College in 1976 with a BFA in art. She moved to Buffalo, New York and from there established Top Stories, a prose periodical containing "experimental fiction written by (mostly) women authors, styled as chapbooks with each issue dedicated to a single writer." At the same time she participated in Hallwalls Contemporary Arts Center and enrolled at the University at Buffalo. Her first publication of Top Stories, was printed in 1978 by Hard Press, and sold for one dollar. Top Stories published art and writings by writers, photographers, and artists such as Kathy Acker, Laurie Anderson, Constance DeJong, Jenny Holzer, Cookie Mueller, Richard Prince, ceasing in 1991. In 1991 City Lights Books published Top Top Stories edited by Turyn. In 2022 Primary Information, Brooklyn re-issued the entire run of Top Stories in a two volume set.

Turyn's book of photographs, Missives, was published in 1986 by Alfred van der Marck editions, with an essay by Andy Grundberg. In 2020 a catalogue accompanying her one-person show at Weiss Berlin, Anne Turyn, Top Stories, with contributions by DeJong, Douglas Eklund, Chris Kraus, Adam D. Weinberg, and Angharad Williams, was published. The publication was shortlisted for the 2020 Paris Photo–Aperture Foundation PhotoBook Awards, Photography catalogue category.

== Exhibitions ==
Turyn's photographs were included in the 1979 group exhibition The Altered Photograph at MoMA PS1 and were included in the 1980 exhibition Hallwalls: Five Years at the New Museum, both in New York City. In 1982 her photographs were featured in the window of the New Museum, curated by Robin Dodds. In 1984 she was included in Color Photographs: Recent Acquisitions at the Museum of Modern Art, New York City. In 1986, Turyn had a one-person exhibition at Art City (owned by Leslie Tonkonow) in New York; an exhibition, Anne Turyn: Work from Five Series, at the Contemporary Arts Museum Houston curated by Linda Cathcart; and was included in a group exhibition, entitled Remembrances of Things Past, at the Long Beach Museum of Art curated by Connie Fitzsimons. Turyn's public art piece, 'What if the Sky were Orange' was presented by the Public Art Fund as part of 'Messages to the Public' on the Spectacolor board in Times Square in 1988. In 1989 Turyn was included in Vanishing Presence, curated by Adam Weinberg, at the Walker Art Center, which also traveled. Turyn was included in the seminal exhibition at the Museum of Modern Art, Pleasures and Terrors of Domestic Comfort, curated by Peter Galassi in 1991.

In 1995, Turyn collaborated with Hallwalls Contemporary Art Center to present a group exhibition at the Burchfield Penney Art Center titled Alternatives: 20 Years Of Hallwalls Contemporary Arts Center. The following year, Turyn was one of 23 alumni whose work was selected to be displayed at the University at Buffalo Art Gallery.

In 2010 Turyn was included in Pictures by Women at the Museum of Modern Art, New York, curated by Roxana Marcoci, Sarah Meister and Eva Respini. In 2010 her work was also included in Between Here and There: Passages in Contemporary Photography curated by Douglas Eklund at the Metropolitan Museum of Art, New York. In 2010 Turyn was included in 'Exposure: Photos from the Vault' curated by Eric Paddock at the Denver Art Museum.

In 2017, Turyn had a solo exhibit at Southfirst Gallery, Brooklyn, NY, titled Anne Turyn: Top Stories Archive & Selected Flashbulb Memories, 1978-1991 which presented her photographs alongside selections from the Top Stories archive. Turyn's photographs, along with issues of Top Stories, were included in the 2017 exhibition at Kunsthalle Bern, Section Littéraire (Valérie Knoll and Geraldine Tedder, curators).

In 2020 Kunstverein Amsterdam displayed Turyn's Messages to the Public (1988) outdoors in Amsterdam and in 2021 exhibited Top Stories in the gallery. In 2023, the Museum of Fine Arts Le Locle in Neuchâtel, Switzerland presented Lessons & Notes with The Pleasure of Text.

== Publications ==
- Missives. Alfred van der Marck, 1986. Photographs by Anne Turyn with an essay by Andy Grundberg
- Top Top Stories. San Francisco: City Lights, 1991. Edited by Turyn.
- Anne Turyn, Top Stories. Berlin: Weiss Berlin, 2020. Edited by Elena Cheprakova and Kirsten Weiss.
- Real Family Stories, Top Stories #13, Buffalo, NY, 1982
- Volunteer, CEPA Gallery, Buffalo NY, 1982
- Top Stories, edited by Anne Turyn, Primary Information, Brooklyn, NY 2022

== Collections ==
Turyn's work is held in the following permanent collections:

- Birmingham Museum of Art
- Burchfield Penney Art Center, Buffalo, N.Y.
- Center for Creative Photography
- Denver Art Museum
- George Eastman Museum
- LightWork, Syracuse
- Los Angeles County Museum of Art
- Metropolitan Museum of Art
- Museum of Modern Art, New York
- Portland Art Museum
- Walker Art Center
- Whitney Museum of American Art
- Yale University
