= Marcus Carl Franklin =

American actor

- Born: February 24, 1993 (age 33); Carmel, New York

Marcus Carl Franklin (born February 24, 1993) is an American actor. He is best known for portraying an incarnation of Bob Dylan, who calls himself "Woody Guthrie", in the Bob Dylan biopic I'm Not There, written and directed by Todd Haynes; for this role, he was nominated for the Independent Spirit Award for Best Supporting Male. Franklin is seen as a young hobo, hitching rides on freight trains, while clutching a guitar case bearing the inscription "This machine kills fascists" (this inscription adorned the guitar of Woody Guthrie). In the film, Franklin performs a rendition of Dylan's song "When the Ship Comes In." His performance is also on the soundtrack album of I'm Not There.

Franklin also was in Lackawanna Blues on HBO, which aired in 2005. He acted in the off-Broadway and Broadway productions of Caroline or Change.

== Filmography ==
- Dragon Tales Let's Start a Band (2003) (TV film) - Himself
- Law & Order (2004) (TV) - "Tate" (episode: Can I Get a Witness?)
- Lackawanna Blues (2005) (TV) - "Ruben Santiago Jr."
- The Water Is Wide (2006) (TV) - "Charles"
- I'm Not There (2007) - "Woody Guthrie"
- Be Kind Rewind (2008) - "James"
- The Art of Getting By (2011) - "Will"
- Blue Bloods (2011) (TV) - "Tom Mackey" (episode: Age of Innocence)
- The Inevitable Defeat of Mister & Pete (2013) - "College Kid"
- But Not for Me (2015) - "Will"

== Awards/nominations ==
- Independent Spirit Awards
  - 2008, Best Supporting Male: I'm Not There (nominated)
