= David Gates (author) =

American novelist

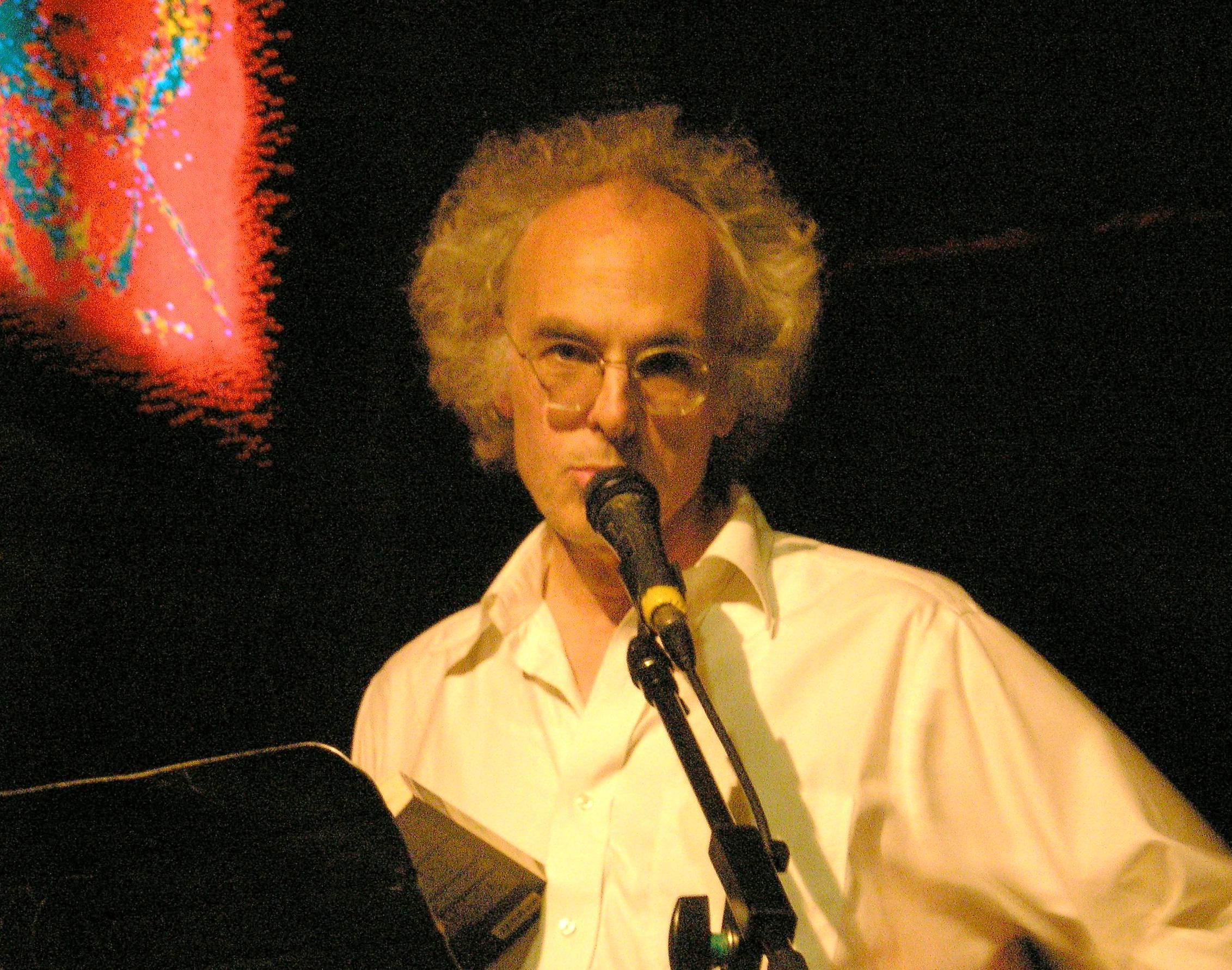
- David Gates at the Bowery Poetry Club in New York City
- Born: January 8, 1947 (age 79)
- Education: University of Connecticut (BA)
- Occupations: Novelist, journalist
- Writing career
- Notable awards: Guggenheim Fellowship (1998)

David Gates (born January 8, 1947) is an American journalist and novelist. His works have been shortlisted for the National Book Critics Circle Award and the Pulitzer Prize.

== Education ==
Gates obtained his B.A. from the University of Connecticut in 1972.

== Career ==
Gates' first novel, Jernigan (1991), about a dysfunctional one-parent family, was a Pulitzer Prize finalist in 1992 and a finalist for the National Book Critics Circle Award. This was followed by a second novel, Preston Falls (1998), and two short story collections, The Wonders of the Invisible World (1999) and A Hand Reached Down to Guide Me (2015).

Gates has published short stories in The New Yorker, Tin House, Newsweek, The New York Times Book Review, Bookforum, Rolling Stone, H.O.W, The Oxford American, The Journal of Country Music, Esquire, Ploughshares, GQ, Grand Street, TriQuarterly, and The Paris Review. Gates is also a Guggenheim Fellow.

== Journalism ==
Until 2008, Gates was a senior writer and editor in the Arts section at Newsweek magazine, specializing in articles on books and music.

== Teaching ==
Gates taught in the creative writing program at The University of Montana as well as at the Bennington Writing Seminars. He is a member of the Dog House Band, performing on the guitar, pedal steel, and vocals.
