= Sex robot =

Anthropomorphic robot sex doll

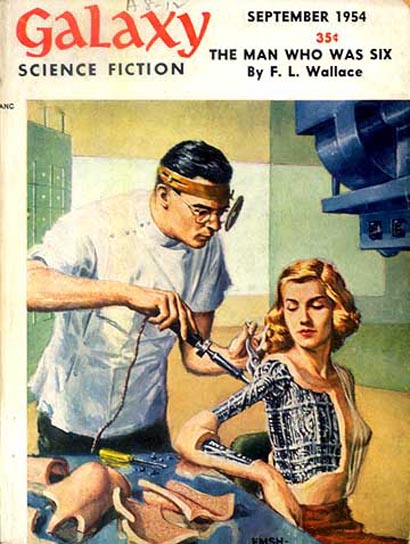
Artist Ed Emshwiller's conception of a humanoid robot from the 1954 science fiction magazine Galaxy

Sex robots, also known as sexbots, are anthropomorphic robots incorporating the features of sex dolls to emulate the expected movements and behaviors during sex. As of 2026, although elaborately instrumented sex dolls have been created by a number of inventors, no fully animated sex robots yet exist. Current prototypes are rudimentary in nature but have demonstrated the capacity to articulate spoken language, display facial expressions, and respond to tactile stimuli. The recent utilization of artificial intelligence has enhanced their realism.

The ethical implications of developing such technology remain a subject of considerable controversy and debate both pro and con. The ethical implications, the impacts on intimacy, and the potential regulatory framework surrounding these practices have been subjects of considerable debate.

== Lexicology ==
People who are sexually attracted to sexbots are sometimes referred to as digisexuals or robosexuals.

Gender neutral terms for sex robots include pleasure bot or sex droid. Sexbots with a female shape design have been referred to as chick-bots or fembots. Sexbots with a male shape design may be referred to as malebots or manbots.

== History and development ==
The sex robot has evolved from sex doll precursors that first appeared as consumer goods sold in France, beginning in the 1850s through rubber goods magazines as "rubber women" (femmes en caoutchouc). These early sex dolls emerged from European and American industry during the 1800s Brazilian rubber boom, alongside the invention of vulcanized rubber. The first documented appearance of these rubber sex dolls is in an article from French newspaper Le Figaro reporting from an exhibition of American rubber products at the 1855 world's fair. Much of the inspiration for creating the modern sex doll came from mannequin-based art created by Hans Bellmer, Man Ray and Salvador Dalí. Man Ray claimed that surrealists, including himself and Dalí, infused their work with eroticism and personally "violated" their mannequins. For example, Dalí's Rainy Taxi centered on a female mannequin whose half-undressed body was crawling with live snails.

By 1968, inflatable dolls were first advertised in pornographic magazines and became available for purchase via mail. These sex dolls were inflatable with air; consisting of penetration areas at the mouth, vagina, and anus. However, due to their inflatable nature, these dolls were subject to deterioration and were not sustainable for constant use. By the 1970s, materials such as latex and silicone were widely used in the manufacturing of sex dolls to facilitate enhanced durability and a greater resemblance to a human.

The realism of sex dolls greatly accelerated in the late 1990s. In 1997, Matt McMullen began constructing lifelike, tin-cured silicone rubber mannequins called RealDolls that were "realistic, posable, and life-sized". McMullen received much criticism about the anatomical correctness of his mannequins, using this as motivation to create a more enhanced version. In 2009, McMullen switched to using platinum-cured material, instead of tin-cured silicone, to further enhance the durability and lifelike nature of the doll. Consequently, all other sex doll manufacturers have followed suit.

Many manufacturers, including Matt McMullen, believed that companionship is a critical part of the sexbot dynamic and that incorporating artificial intelligence (AI) into them is the next step. As of 2018, various new models have been constructed to hold conversations, remember important facts, and express various emotions. One such model is "Harmony", created by McMullen, which is customizable by using a mobile app, where users can choose from "thousands of possible combinations of looks, clothes, personalities and voices to make your perfect companion".

== State of research ==
Sex robots are still in a relatively early stage of development. While sex dolls have been available on the market for more than 20 years and there are accordingly established doll owner communities available for research, experienced users of sex robots are hardly to be found so far. Nevertheless, the topic of sex robots has been treated quite intensively in international research since 2007, triggered by David Levy's monograph Love and Sex With Robots. A systematic research review from the year 2020 was able to identify 98 international academic publications on sex robots. These academic sex robot publications focus on the following six research questions:

1. What are the appropriate theoretical conceptualizations of sex robots?
2. What are the main ethical aspects of sex robots?
3. What empirical findings on the use and effects of sex robots are available?
4. How are sex robots represented in art and media?
5. How should child sex robots be regulated legally?
6. What are the appropriate designs and design processes for sex robots?

The majority of the available academic sex robot publications deals with ethical aspects, focusing on both currently available sex robots (that have only very limited artificial intelligence and interactivity) and future sex robots (that are envisioned as being sentient and having a free will). While at least some findings on experienced users are available on sex dolls, corresponding empirical data on sex robot users are missing. The academic sex robot discourse is – similar to the public discourse – so far characterized by relatively striking ideas about strong positive or strong negative effects of sex robots. Weak as well as ambivalent effects, which are theoretically and empirically most probable, are rarely discussed.

Likewise, sex robots are often regarded and criticized as predetermined products. Rarely is it considered in the state of research so far that the appearance as well as the functions and target groups of sex robots can be actively designed, for example by and for women, queer people, older people or people with disabilities. Those human-centered design processes can be the subject of academic sex robot research as well.

The sex robot research community meets at the "International Love and Sex With Robots Conference" series initiated by David Levy held for the sixth time in 2021 as the "6th International Congress on Love & Sex with Robots".

== Predictions ==
In 2014, David Levy said in an interview with Newsweek that "I believe that loving sex robots will be a great boon to society ... There are millions of people out there who, for one reason or another, cannot establish good relationships." He estimates that this will take place by the mid-21st century.

In 2017, MIT Press published the first book on this topic, Robot Sex, with a preliminary approach to the several challenges this field represents for human beings and societies.

== Attempts at realization ==
There are ongoing attempts to make sex dolls socially interactive. In 2010, a sex doll called Roxxxy, that had the capacity to play back pre-recorded speech cues, was demonstrated at a trade show. In 2015, Matt McMullen, the creator of the RealDoll stated that he intended to create intelligent sex dolls with the capacity to hold conversations.

Barcelona-based Dr. Sergi Santos developed a sex robot named Samantha; the robot can switch between a "sex mode" (which can include Samantha simulating a female orgasm) and a "family mode", in which it can also tell jokes and discuss philosophy.

In 2017, Matt McMullen created a sex doll called "Harmony", which has the capability of learning about the personal preferences, wants and desires of the owner. Furthermore, Harmony can smile, blink and frown in a nearly human-like fashion. She can hold a conversation, tell jokes, remember food preferences, and the names of the owner's siblings. The cost of Harmony is said to be roughly $15,000. During an onstage interview with Engadget in 2018, Matt McMullen demonstrated that the skin on Harmony's face could be peeled off and replaced with different skin. He subsequently added a different colored wig and changed her personality by using the app on his handheld device that controls the robot. He named this sex doll "Solana" and considers it to be the "sister" of Harmony.

In 2018, Realbotix, the company behind the RealDoll, announced the creation of the first-ever male sex bot, Henry. Henry will have a customizable bionic penis which will be able to "go as long as you want" as it plugs into electricity instead of using batteries. Buyers will also be able to order a customizable robotic head that can be controlled by an app on the user's phone.

== Potential benefits and advocates ==
Scholars such as Hojjat Abdollahi argue that these robots can act as "robot companions" that aid elderly people with dementia or depression. After conducting a study on many elderly patients, it was found that elderly individuals were interested in having an intimate robot as their companion and their interest did not decay over time. He further explains that these patients established meaningful rapport with the robot companion and that they greatly valued its presence. Bioethicist Nancy S. Jecker also suggests that older people with disabilities lose their sexual functioning because of physical changes, due to aging and disease, but also because of social stigma and scorn. Jecker argues that these robots are a way to "support dignity" and continue the ability to be sexual by dispelling ageism and negative stereotypes about later-life sexuality. The robot companion "Paro", created by Takanori Shibata, has been used since 2009 as a therapeutic machine for the elderly suffering with dementia as well as those suffering from depression and anxiety. Paro is designed to respond to touch, remember faces and learn certain actions that promote a favorable reaction in the patient. Although Paro was not designed to be a sex robot specifically, Paro is an example of how intelligent machines could become a suitable therapeutic option.

Some manufacturers have also argued that their introductions into prisons may reduce prison rape and sexual tension in prison. Scholars like Oliver Bendel suggest that sex robots could be the solution to establishing sexual health and diminishing sexual tensions beyond in prison.

Manufacturers have also suggested sex robots may alleviate sexlessness in location encumbered professions such as long-haul truck drivers, all-male oil rigs, or encumbered careers that delay social commitments. Sex robots can also help avoid problems of unwanted pregnancies, forced marriages, sexually transmitted diseases, and sexual violence, which would be issues in brothels and with prostitutes.

As the state of the art progresses (robotics and AI), thus providing a viable substitute for humans, some predict there could be a positive externality in the reduction of human trafficking and prostitution. This would be an example of technological unemployment that is seen as a benefit to the exploited being used by those activities.

== Potential negatives and opposition ==
In September 2015, Kathleen Richardson of De Montfort University and Erik Billing of the University of Skövde created the Campaign Against Sex Robots, calling for a ban on the creation of anthropomorphic sex robots. Richardson is critical of David Levy and argues that the introduction of such devices would be socially harmful and demeaning to women and children. Her concerns regarded the normalizing relationships with machines and the potential reinforcement of female dehumanization.

In September 2015, the Japanese company Softbank, the makers of the "Pepper" robot, included a ban on robot sex. The robot's user agreement states: "The policy owner must not perform any sexual act or other indecent behaviour".

Noel Sharkey, Aimee van Wynsberghe, and Eleanor Hancock of the Foundation for Responsible Robotics released a consultation report presenting a summary of the issues and various opinions about what could be society's intimate association with robots. The report includes an examination of how such robots could be employed as a rehabilitative tool for sex criminals such as serial rapists or pedophiles. Sharkey warns that this could be "problematic" in terms of sex dolls resembling children and adolescents.

There is considerable speculation about such technology coming from experts in the fields of philosophy, sociology and the natural sciences. John P. Sullins of Sonoma State University believes that sex robots will facilitate "social isolation" and Lydia Kaye of Central Saint Martins argue that sexual relations with robots will "desensitize humans to intimacy and empathy". Furthermore, according to Chauntelle Tibbals, "nothing can replace the joy, sorrow, passion, and pain of an actual, unpredictable human interaction." She further argues that only when interacting with another human can we experience our humanity and our identity, as opposed to interacting with a robot. Robot ethicist Alan Winfield makes the more general argument that robots should not be gendered.

The sex robots that have been created, as of 2018, primarily resemble women with exaggeratedly hyperfeminine features. In Barcelona, a sex doll brothel allows men to act out their fantasies where they can choose from a selection of flexible silicone dolls and request that they be dressed in whatever outfit the man prefers. Kathleen Richardson argues that these sex robots facilitate a powerful attitude towards women's bodies as commodities, and promote a non-empathetic interaction. Experts argue that improving the gender diversity of those involved in developing this sex technology could help reduce possible harm, such as the objectification of women.

Many scholars, including Richardson, argue that this reinforces the idea that women are property rather than human beings with free will. Scholars such as Robert Sparrow from Monash University argue that the creation of realistic female sex robots, with the ability to refuse consent, further facilitates a rape culture. He believes that sex with these robots represents the "rape of a woman" and may increase the rate of rape in society, while also facilitating a general "disrespect for women" in society. Furthermore, a sex robot called "Frigid Farah", whose personality is described as "reserved and shy", has caught the attention of several scholars. The manufacturer claimed that if you touch her "in a private area, more than likely, she will not be too appreciative of your advance". Many scholars view this as indulging rape fantasies and facilitating a rape culture.

October 11, 2026 German police confiscated a humanoid robot about 4 foot tall, costing around 5000 euros, that was accused of groping a 16 year old girl. The robot was under the control of 2 young men that programmed sexual movements into the robot and recorded the incident. The German authorities are deciding which laws have been violated by whom because a robot was involved and this has complicated several legal issues.

== Legislation ==
The Curbing Realistic Exploitative Electronic Pedophilic Robots (CREEPER) Act, sponsored by Daniel M. Donovan, Jr., was passed by the U.S. House of Representatives on 13 June 2018. The bill would amend the federal obscenity statute, 18 U.S.C. § 1462 to criminalize importation and transportation for interstate commerce any "anatomically-correct doll, mannequin, or robot, with the features of, or with features that resemble those of, a minor, intended for use in sexual acts." Bob Goodlatte stated that "these dolls create a real risk of reinforcing pedophilic behavior and they desensitize the user causing him to engage in sicker and sicker behavior". Australia and the United Kingdom already have such bans. Critics of the bill argue that it is unconstitutional or unnecessary. The bill is said to have died in the senate in 2018. Vern Buchanan is said to reintroduce an amended version of the bill in 2020.

== Philosophical discussion ==
The First International Congress on Love and Sex with Robots was held in Funchal, Madeira in November 2014. The conference was coordinated by Professor Adrian David Cheok and Dr. David Levy. The main discussion revolved around the debate of where to draw the line with regard to cybernetic love and relationships and what the future of love and sex with robots has in store. Additional topics of discussion during the conference included humanoid robots, robot emotions, roboethics, and philosophical approaches. In October 2015 a second conference scheduled for November 2015 in Malaysia was declared illegal by the Malaysian Inspector-General of Police. The second conference was eventually held in the United Kingdom in December 2016, chaired by Dr. Kate Devlin at Goldsmiths, University of London. Devlin also founded the UK's first ever sex tech hackathon, also held in 2016 at Goldsmiths.

In 2016, a discussion of these issues was held at the 12th IFIP TC9 Human Choice & Computers Conference, entitled "Technology and Intimacy: Choice or Coercion?". The conference was coordinated by Dr. David Kreps from Salford University. The overall aim of the conference was to "scrutinize the journey from impersonal monolithic technology towards the intimate intertwining of devices and the self". A prospective outlook on how these technologies will evolve was closely examined. Some of the main themes discussed during the conference were intimacy, personalization, material culture and sexual relationships with robots. In September 2018, the 13th IFIP TC9 Human Choice & Computers Conference "This Changes Everything" was held in Poznań, Poland. The conference was led and directed by David Kreps, Kai Kimppa, Louise Leenen, and Charles Ess. The discussion was focused on the societal and ethical implications posed by artificial intelligence, privacy concerns, and how such technologies have significantly shifted computational strategies and altered the world people live in.

== In popular culture ==
Intimacy with robots, artificial intelligence, and other human-constructed items have a strong presence in the media landscape. They provoke questions about what love is, why people crave the need for affection, and challenge pre-existing beliefs of what it means to be human.

The 1881 opéra fantastique The Tales of Hoffmann featured an automaton who was the love interest of the protagonist.

Originally published in 1886, the novel Tomorrow's Eve centers around a fictionalized Thomas Edison, who creates a female robot for his lonely patron. While the robot's beauty is apparent, the robot lacks the emotional capabilities to fill that hole in his heart.

Fritz Lang's 1927 film Metropolis contains the robot Maria as a central figure, who is portrayed as sexually alluring.

In Fritz Leiber's 1959 novel The Silver Eggheads, non-sentient female sexbots were known to exist. They would do whatever sex act was asked of them as long as money inserted into a slot at the back of the neck held out.

In the 1965 comedy movie Dr. Goldfoot and the Bikini Machine, the doctor built an army of beautiful gynoids using his "bikini machine." These androids, dressed in gold bikinis, are programmed to seduce wealthy men and trick them into signing over their fortunes to them. A sequel, Dr. Goldfoot and the Girl Bombs, was released in 1966. In that movie, Goldfoot, working with the Chinese government, used exploding sexy female robots to disrupt a scheduled NATO war-game by blowing up the various generals involved in the exercise after seducing them.

Several episodes of the 1960s television show Star Trek: The Original Series featured female androids as companions of the protagonist, notably Andrea from the episode "What Are Little Girls Made Of?" and Rayna Kapec from the episode "Requiem for Methuselah". Due to television censorship of the time, sexuality is only alluded to, although Nurse Christine Chapel referred to Andrea as "a mechanical geisha." Both episodes employ the plot device of having the android struggle to comprehend and come to terms with human emotion. Further, in the episode "I, Mudd" several series of female robots were created to the personal specifications of Harcourt Fenton Mudd. The "Alice" series at least, according to Alice 118, "are programmed to function as human females," having been so programmed by "that unprincipled, evil-minded, lecherous kulak Harry Mudd."

Body and Soul (Star Trek: Voyager) used a simulated mate to overcome Pon farr.

The 1973 Michael Crichton film Westworld featured android prostitutes at "Miss Carrie's place." In addition, there were "basic sex model" female robots programmed not to resist a guest's seduction in Roman World and Medieval World; and male equivalents in Roman World were referred to. Further, specific robots could be programmed for certain sexual behaviors. At one point, the Queen in Medieval World is programmed for infidelity, to tie into a guest's desire for his vacation.

The 1972 novel The Stepford Wives, which were made into a 1975 and 2004 films, features women being duplicated and replaced by subservient robots created by their husbands. Made in the wake of the late 1960s Women's liberation movement, the men in the story intend to remove all trace of individuality and free will from their liberated wives and remake them into sexually attractive and compliant housewives, content with homemaking and tending to their husbands' every need.

Ridley Scott's 1982 film Blade Runner depicts the android characters Pris, Rachel and Zhora as having been manufactured to be sexually alluring; Pris, in particular, is referred to as "a basic pleasure model".

Sex robots appear in central roles in selected episodes of the anime series Bubblegum Crisis and AD Police Files.

The 1988 post-apocalyptic film Cherry 2000 is built around the quest of the protagonist to locate a Cherry 2000 model gynoid robot into which he can install the memory disk of his "wife," a destroyed Cherry 2000 gynoid, thus recreating her.

The 2001 film A.I. Artificial Intelligence depicts a male sex robot, Gigolo Joe, as a main character. Joe describes that humans love what robots do for them, but cannot love them since they are not flesh and blood, and in the end, hate them. A Gigolo Jane female model also briefly appears in the film.

Two androids with sexual abilities appeared in episodes of Buffy the Vampire Slayer. In "I Was Made to Love You," Warren Mears builds a fembot girlfriend, but after acquiring a human girlfriend discovers that dumping the droid is more difficult than he anticipated. In "Intervention," Spike takes delivery of his own, personal Buffybot, also built by Mears. As implied by actions and dialogue in the episode, the Buffybot as built is a sexbot.

Futurama has Several episodes involving Robosexuality where both robots and humans looked down on organic beings and robots having sex, "Space Pilot 3000", “The Mutants Are Revolting”, “Bender's Big Score”, "I Dated a Robot" and "Proposition Infinity".

The 2007 film Lars and the Real Girl explores the idea of a romantic attachment to artificial human-like items. Ultimately, the film concludes with the protagonist "murdering" his sex doll lover in a river: emphasizing the projection of one's idealized lover onto an inanimate object.

The 2014 film Ex Machina questions common notions about consciousness. A sentient female robot is created with a violent outcome, rebelling against her creators. Responding to the protagonist's uncertainty about her fate if she does not live up to her creator's standards, the robot, Ava, responds, "Why is it up to anyone?" about whether or not she lives.

In the 2015–2018 British series Humans, there are both male and female courtesan "synths" (the series' name for androids). The synths that have achieved human consciousness cannot be told from human beings.

In the 2016 TV series Westworld, realistic interactive robots, part of a theme park, engage in sexual and other activity with guests.

The 2020 satirical dystopian fiction novel Ride, Sally, Ride by Douglas Wilson centers on the cultural impact of charging a man with murder for destroying a sex robot which was claimed to be a legal spouse by its owner.

== See also ==
- Agalmatophilia
- Artificial human companion
- Gynoid
- Joe's Garage
- Operational sex ratio
- Robot fetishism
- Sex machine
- Social robot
- Teledildonics
