= Robot fetishism =

Fetishistic attraction to humanoid robots

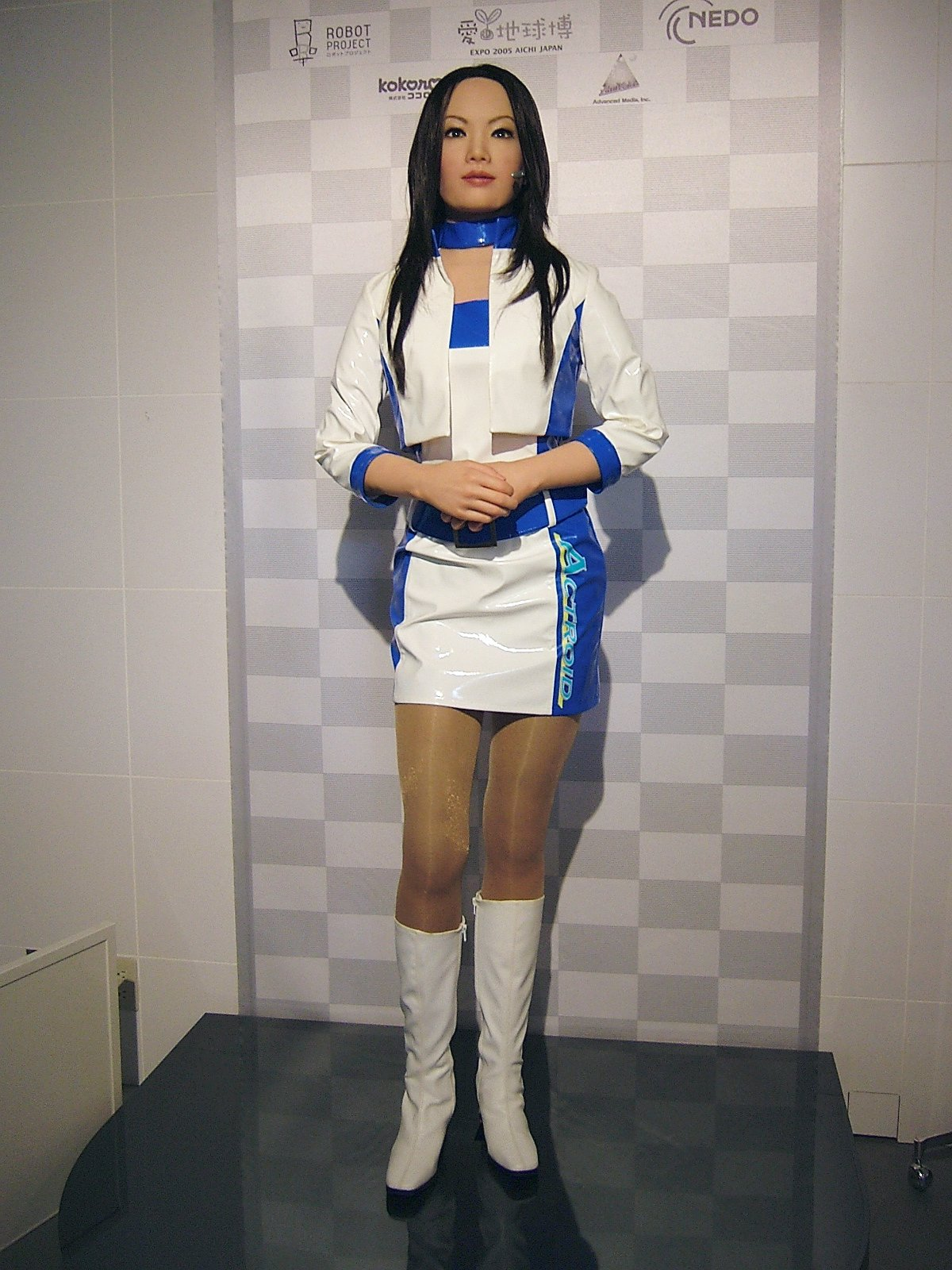
An Actroid manufactured by Kokoro Company Ltd.

Robot fetishism (also ASFR, robosexuality, and robophilia) is a fetishistic attraction to humanoid robots; also to people acting like robots or people dressed in robot costumes. A less common fantasy involves transformation into a robot. In these ways, it is similar to agalmatophilia, which involves attraction to or transformation into statues or mannequins.

Robot fetishism can be viewed as a form of erotic anthropomorphism. When transformation or roleplaying is involved it can be thought of as a form of sexual objectification.

== ASFR ==
By its enthusiasts, robot fetishism is more commonly referred to by the initials "ASFR". This initialism stems from the now-defunct Usenet newsgroup alt.sex.fetish.robots. Many devotees of this fetish refer to themselves as technosexual, or as "ASFRians". ASFR can be divided into two distinct but sometimes overlapping types of fantasies.

The first of these is simply a desire to have a ready-made android partner. This partner can be desired for sex, companionship, or any combination of the two. The main distinguishing feature of this fantasy is that the android is a completely artificial construct, often manufactured solely to fulfil the wishes of its owner. This type of fantasy or situation is referred to as "built".

The second type of fantasy prevalent within ASFR is referred to as "transformation". This involves a human who has been either willingly or unwillingly turned into an android. That person can be either oneself or one's partner, or both. It is usually the process of transformation (through whatever means it is achieved) that is the focus of this fantasy.

Many people in the ASFR community prefer either one or the other. In some cases this preference is very strong, and people can be as equally repelled by one type as they are attracted to the other. In other cases, there is as much appreciation for built as there is for transformation. A recent informal survey of ASFR community members found that two thirds prefer built while the remainder prefer transformation or some combination of both.

The aspects of this fetish that are most appreciated by members of the ASFR community are greatly varied. For some, things like robotic appearance, motion, or sound are important for arousal. For others, these are not, and a completely lifelike android that appears to be human is desired. This holds true for other aspects, such as sentience or self-awareness. The ability of the android to remove parts of its skin or other bodily appendages in order to reveal its circuitry is quite pleasing to some, but distasteful to others. There is a further divide between those who prefer an android to appear human-like and those who would prefer a more mechanical looking robot, i.e. with a metallic surface.

As realistic androids and humanoid robots do not currently exist in a form readily available to the consumer, this fetish can only be acted upon in a limited number of ways. Primarily this is done through fantasy, involving either self stimulation or sexual roleplaying with a partner. ASFR art is therefore important to aid in the reinforcement of imagination.

Art with ASFR content includes but is not limited to science fiction movies, music videos, television shows, novels, short stories, illustrations, manipulated photographs, songs and even television commercials. Such works are sought after by technosexuals since economically viable androids are not yet available. Realistic sex dolls such as the RealDoll may provide a way to explore this fetish with existing technology. Recent developments in robotics and artificial intelligence, such as those seen in the Actroid or EveR-1 may lead to the production of more advanced synthetic partners.

Some ASFRians do not use synthetic partners, and instead prefer human partners to participate in forms of fantasy play.

== In popular culture ==
- In the animated adult cartoon series Futurama, set in the 31st century, "robosexuality" refers to sexual relations between a human and a robot, notably in the episode "Proposition Infinity" (season 6, episode 4), after Amy and Bender start an affair. Their boss, Professor Farnsworth, objects on moral grounds, and two competing propositions are advanced, one to outlaw robosexuality, and the other to legalize it. The Professor drops his opposition when he reveals that his animus stems from his being jilted by a robot lover when he was younger. Robosexuality had been referred to in two earlier episodes, "Space Pilot 3000", the pilot for the series, and "I Dated a Robot" (season 3, episode 15), in which Fry dates a robot which has been downloaded with Lucy Liu's image and personality. In this episode, as opposed to "Proposition Infinity", Bender opposes robot-human relationships.
- In the video game Atomic Heart, there are references to a robotic carnival being used as a robot brothel for the Soviet elite. The character CHAR-les also jokes about the main antagonist, Dmitry Sechenov, using the Twins for sexual intercourse, sparking a conversation between Sergey Nechayev, the player character, and CHAR-les over robosexuality.

== See also ==
- Doll fetishism
- Gynoid
- Mechanophilia
- Sex robot
- Sexual objectification
- Uncanny valley
