= Roxxxy =

Full-size interactive sex doll

Roxxxy, termed a "sex robot", is a full-size interactive sex doll. The robot is built by the New Jersey–based company TrueCompanion. Its engineer is Douglas Hines, founder and president of the company, who worked as an artificial intelligence engineer at the Bell Labs before he founded TrueCompanion. Development of Roxxxy is claimed to have cost between $500,000 and $1 million.

Roxxxy made its public debut at the AVN Adult Entertainment Expo (AEE) in Las Vegas on January 9, 2010. The gynoid stands 5 feet 7 inches tall and weighs 120 pounds (170 cm and 54 kg). It has synthetic skin and an artificial intelligence engine programmed to learn the owner's likes and dislikes. An articulated skeleton allows Roxxxy to be positioned like a human being but the doll cannot move its limbs independently. A pump installed in the robot powers an internal liquid cooling system. The Roxxxy prototype is claimed to have been modeled after a college-aged Caucasian fine arts student.

According to the website of the company, Roxxxy is not limited to sexual uses and "can carry on a discussion and expresses her love to you. She can talk to you, listen to you and feel your touch." Other features include touch sensors that give Roxxxy the ability to sense when it is being moved. The robot's vocabulary may be updated with the help of a laptop (connected to the back by cables) and the Internet.

Customers can ask TrueCompanion to customize the Roxxxy according to personal preferences, such as hair color, eye color, skin color, breast size and other features. Roxxxy is priced at $7,000 to $9,000 plus a separate subscription fee.

According to Douglas Hines, Roxxxy garnered about 4,000 pre-orders shortly after its AEE reveal in 2010. However, as reported by Jenny Kleeman in April 2017, no actual customers have ever surfaced with a Roxxxy doll, and the public has remained skeptical that any commercial Roxxxy dolls have ever been produced.
