= Nancy Oliver =

American playwright

- Born: February 8, 1955 (age 71); Framingham, Massachusetts
- Education: University of Massachusetts Amherst; Florida State University
- Known for: Playwright and screenwriter

Nancy Oliver (born February 8, 1955) is an American playwright and screenwriter who is best known for creating the 2022 miniseries Angelyne and her work on the successful TV series Six Feet Under. Oliver was nominated for the Academy Award for Best Original Screenplay in 2008 for her debut screenplay, Lars and the Real Girl.

== Early life, family and education ==
Oliver was born in Syracuse, New York and raised in Framingham, Massachusetts. She began writing at an early age.

She earned a Bachelor of Arts in English from the University of Massachusetts Amherst. During this time she was involved with the university's theater department as a performer.

She studied Drama at the Banff Fine Arts Center in Canada and Trinity College, Oxford. She earned a Master of Arts degree in Acting and Directing from Florida State University.

== Career ==
While attending Florida State University in Tallahassee, Florida for theatre, Oliver met director and screenwriter Alan Ball in 1976. Together, they founded the General Nonsense Theater Company, a satirical ensemble for which the two wrote, staged and starred in subversive comical sketches. She was also a member of Alarm Dog Rep. A playwright whose work includes Office, Dreams Are Funny, Calypso" and "VW as well as several plays for young people, she twice won Florida's Individual Artist Grant for Playwriting. In addition to working previously as a teacher, columnist and newspaper editor,

After graduating, Oliver supported herself by doing "anything anyone would pay me to do that was kind of mindless—typing, filing, Xeroxing—so I could save the rest for writing and directing." She moved to Los Angeles in 1997 after the computer game she was writing for, Riana Rouge, relocated to the West Coast. She later teamed up again with Alan Ball, becoming his script reader. A few years later, shortly after deciding to abandon show business and move back to Florida, Ball offered her a spot as a writer and co-producer for the award-winning television series Six Feet Under. Oliver began as a writer during the show's third season and stayed on for three years.

The idea for her first screenplay, which would eventually be made into the 2007 film Lars and the Real Girl, was the result of an early job in which she dealt "with a lot of Web sites and a lot of lonely guys." Oliver considers the story, in which a lonely and delusional 27-year-old man forms a romantic attachment to a sex doll, a "contemporary fairy tale". After contemplating the concept for nearly five years, Oliver wrote the script over a nine-month period in 2002, before she was hired at Six Feet Under. In 2002, when her agent asked for a project to shop around, Oliver gave them Lars. In 2005, it was ranked No. 3 on the 2005 edition of The Black List, a compilation of the Top 90 most-liked, un-produced scripts in Hollywood.

Directed by Craig Gillespie and starring Ryan Gosling, the film had its world premiere at the Toronto International Film Festival where it received a standing ovation from the audience. The screenplay was eventually nominated for several awards, including an Academy Award for Original Screenplay. In 2008, Oliver received the Humanitas Prize for the screenplay.

In 2007, Oliver again teamed up with Alan Ball to write and direct episodes for his HBO vampire series, True Blood.

In 2022, Oliver created the Peacock miniseries Angelyne, starring Emmy Rossum.

== Awards and nominations ==
- 2009 Writers Guild of America Award
  - Episodic drama "I Will Rise Up" True Blood (Nominated)
- 2008 Humanitas Prize
  - Feature Film: Lars and the Real Girl
- 2008 Academy Awards
  - Best Original Screenplay: Lars and the Real Girl (Nominated)
- 2008 Broadcast Film Critics Association Awards
  - Best Writer: Lars (Nominated)
- National Board of Review Awards
  - Best Screenplay – Original: Lars (WON [Tied with Diablo Cody for Juno])
- 2008 WGA Award
  - Best Original Screenplay: Lars (Nominated)
- 2007 Satellite Awards
  - Best Screenplay, Original: Lars (Nominated)
- 2006 Writers Guild of America Awards
  - Best Dramatic Series: Six Feet Under (Nominated with ensemble)
