= June Korea =

Photographer

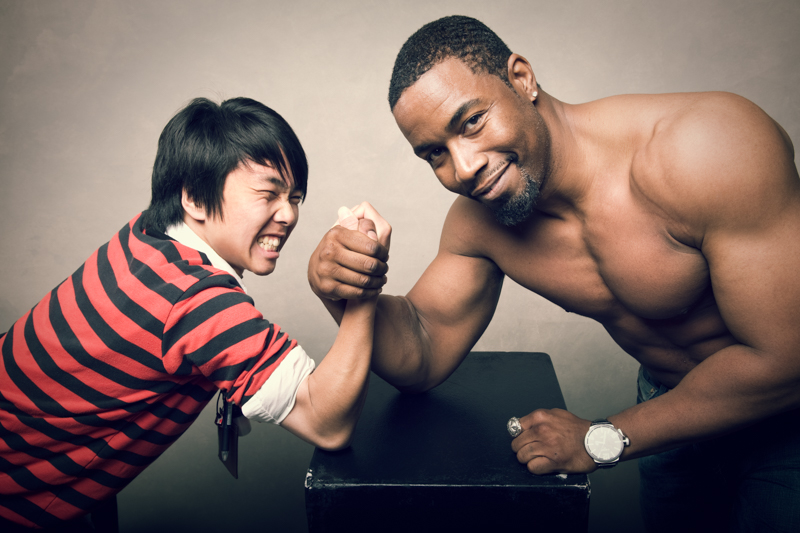
- June Korea with Michael Jai White
- Education: School of Visual Arts
- Occupations: visual artist and photographer
- Website: www.junekorea.com

June Korea (Korean: 조준태(Juntae Cho); born July 22, 1982) is a New York–based visual artist and photographer. Sometimes, his works feature his sex doll Eva. He lives with Eva, his silicon sex doll for his photographic project. His work has been featured in numerous solo and group exhibitions. He and his sex doll have attracted attraction from the media and has been featured in different media publications worldwide.

== Early life ==
He obtained a B.Sc. in Industrial Engineering in South Korea. He received a B.F.A. in Photography and Imaging from Art Center College of Design in California. After that he studied at the School of Visual Arts in New York where he obtained an M.F.A. in Photography, Video and Related Media. While studying at the engineering school, he met another photographer who inspired him to take on photography as a profession.

=== Eva ===
According to an interview he stated that he always felt lonely after coming home from work or parties. He researched life-size dolls to discover the one that will best resemble a human being. He bought Eva in 2014. He sleeps, shops, dines, drives, travels, laughs and cries with her. His love doll Eva is usually captured in a wide range of pictures similar to that of a traditional couple going through various activities.

== Awards ==
- 2017 Life Framer Award—Still Life: 20 Amazing Photographers to Discover.
- 2015 CA it Awards Photography Gold Award.
- 2015 Neutral Density Photography Awards 1st Place—Gold Star Award.
- 2015 Seoul–New York Photo Festival Silver Award.
- 2015 21st Artist Portfolio Award by Artist Portfolio Magazine.
- 2012 53rd CMYK Magazine Award.
- 2012 27th Creative Quarterly Award.
- 2011 MAC Group Photography Award.
- 2011 Museum of Seongnam Arts Center Emerging Artist Award by Seongnam Arts Center.
- 2009 Make-A-Wish Achievement Award by Make-A-Wish Foundation.
- 2005 Feelux Lighting Grand Award.
- 2003 Dong-A Photography Excellence Award by The Dong-A Ilbo.
