= Lars Lindstrom =

Lars Lindstrom may refer to:

- Lars Lindstrom, the main character of Lars and the Real Girl, played by Ryan Gosling
- Lars Lindstrom, the never seen fictional husband of Phyllis Lindstrom, a character in The Mary Tyler Moore Show and Phyllis
