= Xdolls =

Sex toy company

Xdolls is a business housed in an apartment in Paris where customers rent time with lifelike silicone sex dolls. Registered as a gaming center, it opened in 2018 and that March survived a challenge brought by Communist members of the Council of Paris after police declared it does not violate the prohibition on brothels in France.

Xdolls was opened on February 1, 2018, by Joachim Lousquy, who previously operated a chain of vape shops. It is housed in an apartment at a secret location in the 14th arrondissement of Paris. Customers book online to spend time at a rate of €89 per hour in a private room (termed a "game space") with one of four lifelike Chinese-manufactured silicone sex dolls approximately 1.45 m (4 ft 9 in) tall, with virtual reality augmentation available at an extra charge. Lousquy says that the dolls are sprayed clean and sterilized in a separate room and that in addition to men the business attracts some couples. Similar establishments opened earlier in Barcelona (in February 2017), Vienna, and Dortmund in Europe, and in Japan. Lousquy plans to franchise the business in France and Italy.

Feminist groups have objected to the business. Lorraine Questieux of the anti-prostitution group Mouvement du Nid characterized Xdolls as "a place that makes money from simulating the rape of a woman", and Pierre Laurent, general secretary of the French Communist Party, said he would raise the issue in the Senate of "sex robots", "some of which can resemble children". Communist members of the Council of Paris scheduled a discussion for the start of the new session in March 2018 on whether it should be banned under the 1946 law against brothels in France; prostitution was also outlawed by a 2012 law. Police visited Xdolls before the session and determined that it was not in violation, and the motion was defeated. Nicolas Bonnet Oulaldj, head of the council Communists, and fellow Communist member Hervé Bégué declared in a joint press conference that Xdolls constituted "the latest invention to bring brothels back into the landscape" and "the pinnacle of the dehumanisation of the relationship between women and men", saying it trivialized prostitution and human trafficking.
