= Meinü robot =

Chinese humanoid robot

A Meinü robot is a Chinese fembot that was reported on in Chinese news sources in 2006. In Mandarin, Měinǚ Jīqìrén 美女机器人 literally means "beautiful-woman robot" and is officially translated "beauty robot". The first Meinü was later named Miss Rong Cheng.

The unit is capable of locomotion, using visual navigation to avoid obstacles, speech recognition, emotion recognition (whether audio or gestural is not stated), and speaking. It speaks English, Standard Chinese and Sichuanese Mandarin, and can recognize and respond to 1,000 words. It can tell jokes, sing songs, etc. It is intended for tour-guide applications, businesses and hotels, advertising, and possibly for TV-show hosting. Rong Cheng is 163 cm tall and weighs 60 kg.

Rong Cheng was sent to the Sichuan Science and Technology Museum to be a receptionist or tour guide. The first copy build cost was approximately 300,000 yuan ($37,500), but the inventors expect this could be reduced to a third of that if 100 were to be produced. Only one year of research was required to produce it, which suggests it was built upon other projects.

It was worked on by 10 researchers from the Robot Research Center at the Institute of Automation, Chinese Academy of Sciences. ChinaDaily's English edition named the principal designer as Li Chengrong, whereas Reuters and Sina English said it was Yue Hongqiang.

== See also ==
- Actroid (a Japanese gynoid)
- EveR2-Muse (a Korean gynoid)
