= Institute of Automation =

Chinese research institute

The Institute of Automation, Chinese Academy of Sciences (CASIA, Chinese: 自动化研究所; pinyin: Zìdònghuà Yánjiūsuǒ) is a research lab belonging to the Chinese Academy of Sciences which researches robotics, pattern recognition and control theory.

== See also ==
- Meinü robot
- List of datasets for machine-learning research
