= Elena Dorfman =

American fine art photographer

- Born: 1965 (age 60–61); Boston, Massachusetts, U.S
- Education: Sarah Lawrence College
- Occupation: Photographer
- Known for: Portrait series

Elena Dorfman (born 1965) is an American fine art photographer based in Los Angeles, California. Her photographs have been published in The New Yorker, The New York Times, Los Angeles Times, T, and W.

Dorfman is known for her work centering around landscapes and identity through photography and film. Her work is held in collections including the Cincinnati Art Museum, Denver Art Museum, Bass Art Museum, Newcomb Art Museum, Palm Springs Art Museum, and the San Francisco Museum of Modern Art.

== Career ==
Dorfman received a bachelor's degree from Sarah Lawrence College, in 1988. Her photography series explores cultural tensions between the artificial and natural, animals and people, as well as fantasy and reality. Known for research-led works in photography, film, and most recently tapestry, she conducts extensive field studies that have inspired series including Valbona, Sublime: The LA River, Empire Falling, The Pleasure Park, Fandomania: Characters & Cosplay, and Still Lovers.

Dorfman has been represented by the Edwynn Houk Gallery, Robischon Gallery, Modernism, and Frederic Snitzer Gallery.

Her work is the subject of three monographs: Empire Falling (Damiani, 2013), Fandomania (Aperture, 2007), and Still Lovers (Channel, 2005). Dorfman's work from Still Lovers was the focus of several documentary films and the inspiration for the feature film, Lars and the Real Girl. In 2022, the U.S. Embassy in Tirana, Albania, supported her research and restoration work in the National Film Archives to create 'Fragments', a single-channel film installation.

=== Exhibitions ===
- 2001: San Francisco Museum of Modern Art. San Francisco, CA.
- April 12 - May 19, 2007: Edwynn Houk Gallery New York, NY.
- 2019: Fondazione Prada. Milan, Italy.
- 2019: Newcomb Art Museum. New Orleans, LA.
