= Child sex dolls =

A child sex doll is an anatomically correct, life-size sex doll that resembles a pubescent or prepubescent child.

== Production and trade ==
Child sex dolls are usually manufactured in China, Hong Kong and Japan. A number of them were made by Japanese company Trottla.

== Ethical aspects ==
Empirical scientific evidence for the claims that child sex doll ownership is directly or inversely related to sexual offending is scarce and neither claim has been sufficiently supported. A 2023 qualitative study reported that child sex doll ownership was inversely related to sexual behaviors including pornography consumption and sex worker seeking.

Royal Ottawa Mental Health Centre's Michael Seto said that he hopes "that people can get past their emotional reactions to the idea of child sex dolls or fictional child pornography, in the hope that we might find an option that helps people with pedophilia and makes children safer." Georgia Tech researcher and roboethicist Ronald Arkin and Specialist Treatment Organization for the Prevention of Sexual Offending (StopSO) chair Juliet Grayson have compared the use of child sex dolls to prevent child sexual abuse to the therapeutic use of methadone. In a 2017 paper Université Libre de Bruxelles philosopher Marc Behrendt said that child-like sex robots could be used as an alternative means of therapy.

Sex offender risk assessment researcher Wineke Smid stated that "there is no evidence" that child sex dolls are correlated to child sex crimes, and that "it is unlikely there will ever be." Toronto-based psychologist James Cantor stated in 2021, regarding laws that ban child sex dolls, that "there is no evidence to suggest that this is a progressive kind of disease or behavior where people go on from imagination to reality."

Some researchers have studies child sex dolls through the lenses of legal moralism, postulating that the perceived morality of such objects are a valid basis for their criminalization, irrespectively of any objective harm that they might cause. The ownership of child sex dolls has also been argued as a factor of symbolic harm. The legal moralistic stance is not without its critics, such as Ole Martin Moen, a philosopher at the University of Oslo, who unconditionally argues that while all forms of adult-minor sex (except perhaps when the adult and minor are very close in age to each other) are immoral and should thus remain criminalized and illegal, it should not be viewed as immoral (or ideally illegal, with the law needing to be changed in regards to this in his own opinion) for people who are attracted to minors to seek sexual pleasure and satisfaction through outlets that don't involve any real, actual, living children, such as child sex dolls and robots.
