= RealDoll =

Brand of sex dolls

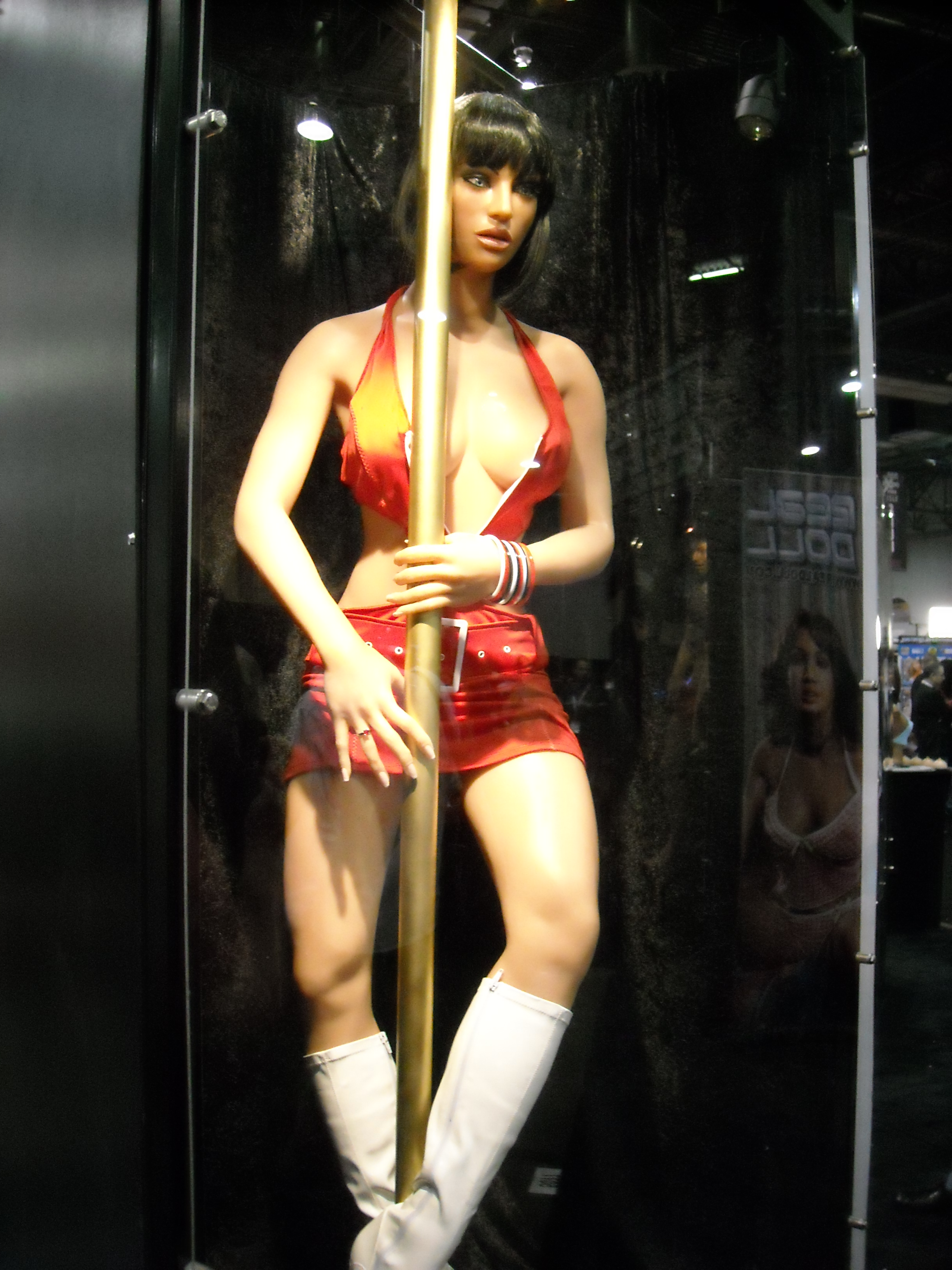
RealDoll exotic dancer

The RealDoll is a life-size sex doll (also considered a mannequin) manufactured by Abyss Creations, LLC in Las Vegas, Nevada, and sold worldwide. It has a poseable PVC skeleton with steel joints and silicone flesh.

Abyss Creations is a subsidiary of Realbotix, previously known as Simulacra before its acquisition by Tokens.com.

== Details and history ==
The RealDolls are designed to recreate the appearance, texture, and weight of human female and male bodies. Their primary function is to serve as sex partners. This activity can be accompanied by certain preparations such as dressing them up in different types of clothes, changing wigs or makeup, and even adjusting body temperature by the use of electric blankets or baths.

Early prototypes were made from solid latex with an interior skeleton, but construction of the outer material was later switched to silicone. In June 2009, Abyss Creations switched from tin cure silicone to platinum silicone, which resulted in dolls that are less prone to tears and compression marks than older RealDolls.

The current incarnation of the female RealDoll product was introduced in 1996. In 2003, Abyss introduced the "Face-X" system, allowing any face to be interchangeable with any body. Multiple faces can then be attached one at a time to a single doll by the owner. As of 2011, there are nine female bodies and 16 female faces in the first product line. In 2009 the RealDoll 2 was introduced, which feature removable inserts for the mouth and vagina and faces that attach by magnets instead of Velcro. The line started with two female bodies and three female faces and, as of 2013, offered ten faces and three bodies of females. Another female body is in the development phase.

Charlie, the first male RealDoll, was retired in 2008 and replaced with two body types and three head types. Transgender dolls may also be purchased from the company, although these must be custom ordered. Abyss also sells silicone toys such as female torso products and dildos among other offerings.

For a time, the company also offered customizations such as robotic hip actuators, finger skeletons (instead of the usual wire finger armatures), and computer-controlled speech feedback, but these expensive options are no longer available.

== See also ==
- Agalmatophilia
- Galatea (mythological statue)
- Gynoid
- Pygmalion (mythology)
- Robot fetishism
- Uncanny valley
- Weird Science (film)
