= Bubble Baba Challenge =

Annual swimming event

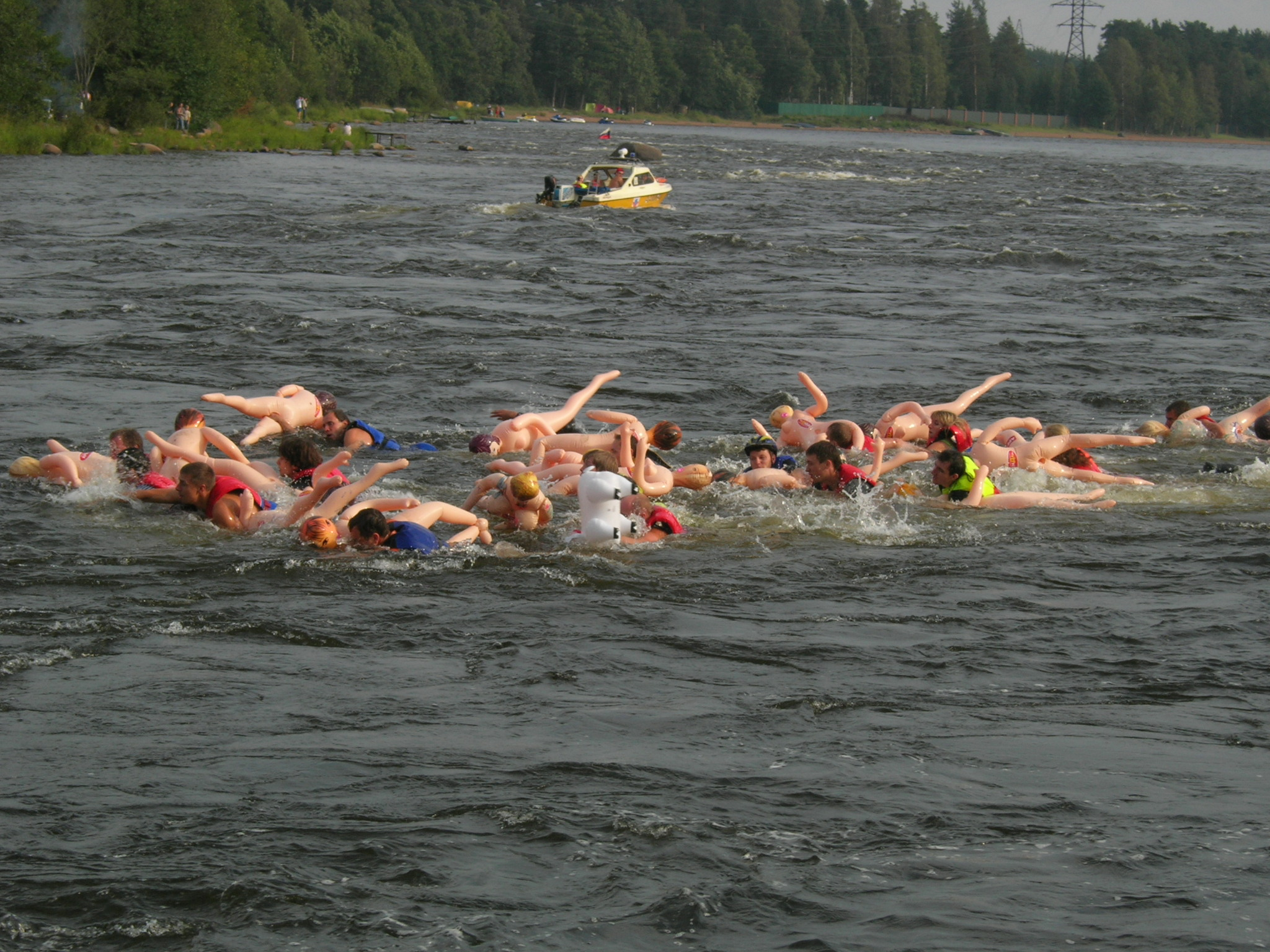
2007 Bubble Baba Challenge

The Bubble Baba Challenge is an event held in the rapids of Vuoksi River in Russia whereby contestants race in the water using sex dolls as flotation devices. It began in 2003 and is staged every year. In 2011 around 800 people participated in the race, but in 2012 it was banned by the authorities because of "dangerously high water levels" and because of the work that was being done to repair the roads and rail bridges downstream. Organisers disputed the ban, claiming that it was only effected as part of a country-wide clamp down on mass gatherings (they claimed that, being aware of the issues, they had nevertheless developed a safe route).

Participants of either gender are allowed to compete but are required to be aged 16 or over and must pass a compulsory alcohol test.

Event has been restarted in 2021. In September 2023, one of the organizers was charged for publishing photos from the event and sharing news about the competition under an administrative offense for disseminating information showing disrespect for society (petty hooliganism, Part 3, Article 20.1 of the Administrative Code). In 2024, due to similar pressure from authorities, the event was canceled., although the court proceedings resulted in the case being sent back to the police for clarification of details
