= Lars and the Real Girl =

2007 film by Craig Gillespie

- Theatrical release poster
- Directed by: Craig Gillespie
- Written by: Nancy Oliver
- Produced by: Sarah Aubrey; John Cameron; Sidney Kimmel
- Starring: Ryan Gosling; Emily Mortimer; Paul Schneider; Kelli Garner; Patricia Clarkson
- Cinematography: Adam Kimmel
- Edited by: Tatiana S. Riegel
- Music by: David Torn
- Production companies: Metro-Goldwyn-Mayer; Sidney Kimmel Entertainment
- Distributed by: MGM Distribution Co.
- Release dates: September 9, 2007 (TIFF); October 12, 2007 (United States)
- Running time: 106 minutes
- Country: United States
- Language: English
- Budget: $12.5 million
- Box office: $11.3 million

Lars and the Real Girl is a 2007 American comedy-drama film written by Nancy Oliver and directed by Craig Gillespie. The film stars Ryan Gosling, Emily Mortimer, Paul Schneider, Kelli Garner, and Patricia Clarkson. Its plot follows Lars, a kind-hearted but socially awkward young man who develops a romantic yet nonsexual relationship with an anatomically correct sex doll, a RealDoll named Bianca.

The movie was inspired by photographer Elena Dorfman's work Still Lovers.

Lars and the Real Girl was released in the United States on October 12, 2007, by MGM Distribution Co. Though a commercial failure, the film was positively received by critics, receiving an Academy Award nomination for Best Original Screenplay, while Gosling received nominations for the Golden Globe Award for Best Actor – Motion Picture Musical or Comedy and the Screen Actors Guild Award for Outstanding Performance by a Male Actor in a Leading Role.

== Plot ==
Lars Lindstrom lives a quiet life in a small town. His mother died when he was born, causing his grief-stricken father to have been a distant parent to Lars and his older brother, Gus. Gus feels guilty for leaving as soon as he could to support himself; Lars struggles with the loss of his mother during his birth and an irrational fear about the risk of death during childbirth. As a result, he exhibits avoidance behaviors and is avoidant of touching others (haphephobia), causing social awkwardness and isolation.

Having inherited the family home after their father's death, the two brothers live on the property along with Gus's wife, Karin. Lars lives in the converted garage, while Gus and Karin, who is pregnant with their first child, live in the main house. Despite Karin's efforts to bring Lars out of his shell, interacting with or relating to his family and co-workers is very difficult for him. A colleague at his office, Margo, also tries to engage him, but Lars is impervious to her attempts.

One evening, Lars announces that he has a visitor whom he met online, a wheelchair-mobile missionary of Brazilian and Danish descent named Bianca. Gus and Karin are startled to discover that Bianca is actually a lifelike doll, ordered from an adult website, whom Lars treats as a live human being. Concerned about his mental health, they convince him to take Bianca to see the family doctor, Dagmar Berman, who is also a psychologist. Berman diagnoses Bianca with low blood pressure and urges Lars to return under the guise of "weekly treatments" for Bianca, while actually analyzing Lars. During this time, Margo has begun to date another co-worker, which silently bothers Lars.

Lars introduces Bianca as his girlfriend to his co-workers and various townspeople. Sympathetic to Lars, the town inhabitants react to the doll as if she were real; however, in order to reduce Lars's dependence on her, they fill her "schedule" with social events and volunteer programs. When Margo reveals to Lars she has broken up with her boyfriend, he agrees to go bowling with her while Bianca attends a school board meeting; later they are joined by more friends.

One morning, Gus and Karin are awakened by a panicked Lars, alarmed because Bianca is unresponsive, and she is rushed to the hospital. After Lars tells Gus and Karin that Bianca is dying, Berman explains that Lars alone has made these decisions about Bianca's future. During a last visit to the lake, Gus and Karin witness a despondent Lars in the water with a "dying" Bianca.

Bianca's funeral is well-attended by the townspeople; after she is buried, Lars and Margo linger at the gravesite. When Margo suggests they catch up with the others, Lars asks if she would like to take a walk. She accepts.

== Cast ==
- Ryan Gosling as Lars Lindstrom
- Emily Mortimer as Karin Lindstrom
- Paul Schneider as Gus Lindstrom
- R. D. Reid as Reverend Bock
- Kelli Garner as Margo
- Nancy Beatty as Mrs. Gruner
- Doug Lennox as Mr. Hofstedtler
- Joe Bostick as Mr. Shaw
- Bianca as herself
- Liz Gordon as Mrs. Schindler
- Nicky Guadagni as Mrs. Petersen
- Patricia Clarkson as Dagmar Berman, MD
- Karen Robinson as Cindy
- Maxwell McCabe-Lokos as Kurt
- Billy Parrott as Erik
- Sally Cahill as Deb
- Angela Vint as Sandy
- Liisa Repo-Martell as Laurel
- Boyd Banks as Russell
- Darren Hynes as Moose
- Víctor Gómez as Hector
- Tommy Chang as Nelson
- Arnold Pinnock as Baxter
- Joshua Peace as Jerry
- Aurora Browne as Lisa
- Alec McClure as Steve
- Tannis Burnett as Nurse Amy
- Lauren Ash as Holly
- Lindsey Connell as Victoria

== Production ==
In The Real Story of Lars and the Real Girl, a special feature on the DVD release of the film, screenwriter Nancy Oliver reveals the inspiration for her script was an actual website, RealDoll.com, which is featured in the film. While researching "weird websites" for an article, Oliver found RealDoll.com. She wrote the script in 2002. The script was the third-ranked screenplay in The Black List in 2005.

The film, set in the US state of Wisconsin, was filmed with a $12 million budget on location in Alton, Elora, King Township, Toronto, Uxbridge, and Whitevale, all located in the Canadian province of Ontario.

Film credits include Rosalie MacKintosh as "Bianca wrangler" and Karly Bowen as "assistant Bianca wrangler."

== Release ==
The film premiered at the Toronto International Film Festival on September 9, 2007, before going into limited release in the U.S. on October 12, 2007. It initially opened on seven screens in New York City, New York; and Los Angeles, California, and earned $90,418 on its opening weekend. It later expanded to 321 theaters and remained in release for 147 days, earning $5,972,884 domestically and $5,320,639 in other markets for a worldwide box-office total of $11,293,663.

The film was featured at the Austin Film Festival, the Heartland Film Festival, the Torino Film Festival, the Glasgow Film Festival, and the Las Palmas de Gran Canaria International Film Festival.

== Critical reception ==
Lars and the Real Girl received positive reviews from critics, especially for Gosling's performance. On the review aggregator Rotten Tomatoes, the film has a score of 81%, based on reviews from 140 critics, and an average rating of 7.2/10. The site's critical consensus states, "Lars and the Real Girl could've so easily been a one-joke movie. But the talented cast, a great script, and direction never condescend to its character or the audience." On Metacritic, the film has a weighted average score of 70 out of 100, based on 32 reviews.

Roger Ebert of the Chicago Sun-Times awarded the film three and a half out of four and observed, "The film wisely never goes for even one moment that could be interpreted as smutty or mocking. There are so many ways [it] could have gone wrong that one of the film's fascinations is how adroitly it sidesteps them. Its weapon is absolute sincerity. It has a kind of purity to it."

Mick LaSalle of the San Francisco Chronicle called the film "a gentle comedy, offbeat but never cute, never lewd and never going for shortcut laughs that might diminish character."

Manohla Dargis of The New York Times said, "American self-nostalgia is a dependable racket, and if the filmmakers had pushed into the realm of nervous truth, had given Lars and the town folk sustained shadows, not just cute tics and teary moments, it might have worked. Instead the film is palatable audience bait of average accomplishment that superficially recalls the plain style of Alexander Payne, but without any of the lacerating edges or moral ambiguity."

Kenneth Turan of the Los Angeles Times described it as "the sweetest, most innocent, most completely enjoyable film around," "a film whose daring and delicate blend of apparent irreconcilables will sweep you off your feet if you're not careful. The creators of this film were fiercely determined not to go so much as a millimeter over the line into sentiment, tawdriness or mockery. It's the rare film that is the best possible version of itself, but Lars fits that bill."

Alissa Simon of Variety stated, "Craig Gillespie's sweetly off-kilter film plays like a Coen brothers riff on Garrison Keillor's Lake Wobegon tales, defying its lurid premise with a gentle comic drama grounded in reality ... what's fresh and charming is the way the characters surrounding the protagonist also grow as they help him through his crisis."

In 2021, members of Writers Guild of America West (WGAW) and Writers Guild of America, East (WGAE) voted the film's screenplay 96th in WGA's 101 Greatest Screenplays of the 21st Century (so far).

== Accolades ==
Award	Date of ceremony	Category	Recipients	Result
Academy Awards	February 24, 2008	Best Original Screenplay	Nancy Oliver	Nominated
Chicago Film Critics Association	December 13, 2007	Best Actor	Ryan Gosling	Nominated
Chicago Film Critics Association	December 13, 2007	Most Promising Director	Craig Gillespie	Nominated
Critics' Choice Awards	January 7, 2007	Best Actor	Ryan Gosling	Nominated
Critics' Choice Awards	January 7, 2007	Best Screenplay	Nancy Oliver	Nominated
Golden Globe Awards	January 13, 2008	Best Actor – Motion Picture Musical or Comedy	Ryan Gosling	Nominated
Humanitas Prize	September 17, 2008	Feature Film	Nancy Oliver	Won
National Board of Review	January 15, 2008	Top Ten Films	Lars and the Real Girl	Won
National Board of Review	January 15, 2008	Best Original Screenplay	Nancy Oliver	Won
Satellite Awards	December 16, 2007	Best Film – Musical or Comedy	Lars and the Real Girl	Nominated
Satellite Awards	December 16, 2007	Best Actor – Motion Picture Musical or Comedy	Ryan Gosling	Won
Satellite Awards	December 16, 2007	Best Actress – Motion Picture Musical or Comedy	Emily Mortimer	Nominated
Satellite Awards	December 16, 2007	Best Original Screenplay	Nancy Oliver	Nominated
Screen Actors Guild Awards	January 27, 2008	Outstanding Performance by a Male Actor in a Leading Role	Ryan Gosling	Nominated
St. Louis Film Critics Association	December 24, 2007	Best Film – Musical or Comedy	Lars and the Real Girl	Nominated
St. Louis Film Critics Association	December 24, 2007	Best Actor	Ryan Gosling	Nominated
St. Louis Film Critics Association	December 24, 2007	Best Screenplay	Nancy Oliver	Nominated
Writers Guild of America Awards	February 9, 2008	Best Original Screenplay	Nancy Oliver	Nominated
