= René Schwaeblé =

French writer

René Schwaeblé (11th arrondissement of Paris, 13 March 1873 – 1938) was a French writer who authored several popular novels, notably in the crime fiction and romance novel genres.

In addition to popular scientific and esoteric books, at the turn of the century he began writing fiction. After the publication of social novels, including Les Détraqués de Paris : étude des mœurs contemporaines (1904), he limited himself essentially to crime fiction and sentimental novels.

== Works ==
non-exhaustive list

=== Novels ===
- 1899: Notre fin, Éditions A. Charles
- 1904: Les Détraqués de Paris : étude des mœurs contemporaines, Bibliothèque Fin de siècle
- 1907: Dans la peau, Librairie artistique
- 1913: L'Amour à passions, Éditions J. Fort
- 1913: Miss Betty, suivi de Chez Satan, Librairie artistique
- 1920: Mœurs câlines, Éditions modernes
- 1920: Perversion passionnelles, Éditions modernes
- 1920: Folie d'amour, Éditions Ferenczi & fils
- 1927: Le Rayon invisible, Éditions Ferenczi & fils
- 1932: Le Poison mystérieux, Éditions Ferenczi & fils
- 1933: Le Sosie du bandit, Éditions Ferenczi & fils
- 1933: Qui donc sème la mort ?, Éditions Ferenczi & fils
- 1934: Le Diamant-espion, Éditions Ferenczi & fils
- 1935: La Mort qu'on promène, Éditions Ferenczi & fils
- 1935: Cercueils et Bandits, Éditions Ferenczi & fils

=== Other ===
- 1908: Les Voluptés de la morphine, Bibliothèque de l'inconnu
- 1911: Biologie minérale, Éditions H. Daragon
- 1914: Les Excentricités médicales, Éditions J. Rousset
- 1914: Les pierres vivent et meurent, Éditions Le François
- 1914: La Santé par les simples, avec le moyen de reconnaître les bons champignons, Éditions A.-L. Guyot
- 1922: Voulez-vous connaître les oraisons et les secrets merveilleux ?, Éditions H. Billy
- 1922: Voulez-vous connaître la magie ?, Éditions H. Billy
- 1922: Voulez-vous parler avec les morts ?, Éditions H. Billy
- 1922: Voulez-vous connaître l'avenir, la caractère et le tempérament ?, Éditions H. Billy
- 1922: Voulez-vous vous soigner vous-même ?, Éditions H. Billy
- 1930: Voulez-vous forcer l'amour ?, Éditions H. Billy
- 1930: Voulez-vous acquérir et fortifier la volonté ? réussir en tout ?, Éditions H. Billy
