= EveR =

Series of South Korean androids

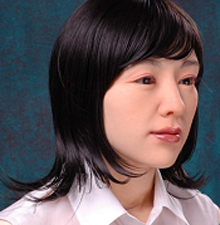
The EveR-2 android had the ability to lip-sync to a song.

EveR is a series of female androids developed by a team of South Korean scientists from the Korea Institute of Industrial Technology in Korea University of Science and Technology. The project is headed by Baek Moon-hong (Korean: 백문홍) and was unveiled to the public at the Kyoyuk MunHwa HoeKwan hotel in Seoul on May 4, 2003. The EveR name is derived from the combination of the Biblical "Eve" and the r from robot.

== EveR-1 ==
EveR-1 (에버원) is a direct competitor of Actroid, which is being developed by Sanrio's Kokoro Dreams and Osaka University of Japan, and was unveiled at the International Robot Exhibition in Tokyo in 2003. EveR-1 was built in a year at a cost of 300 million won (US$321,000) in state funds.

The creators said the humanoid's face is a composite of two well-known Korean actresses, while the torso is based on a singer, though the names of the celebrities were not revealed. The android weighs 50 kilograms and has a height of 160 centimeters.

The creators also said that EveR-1 can mimic the human emotions of happiness, sadness, anger, and surprise more naturally than its Japanese rival, while using a hydraulic system for certain movements. EveR-1 contains a total of 35 miniature motors located throughout its upper body, which enables EveR-1 to move its head, arms, and upper body and even move its lips in synchronization with the robot's speech. Its skin is made of synthetic, pliable silicone jelly that feels similar to human skin.

The android can recognize 400 Korean and English words, allowing it to respond to questions both verbally and through 15 facial expressions: EveR-1 will show displeasure if you poke her. The android also has motion data process sensors in its artificial eyes, enabling it to follow people with its eyes and head.

== EveR-2 ==
EveR-2, later called EveR-2 Muse (에버투 뮤즈) performed at Robot World 2006 in Seoul; it has improved vision and ability to express emotions, as well as various other enhancements. In 2008 EveR-2 could express the facial expressions of happiness, sadness, fear, surprise, anger, and disgust, along with 100 gestures.

Boredom is now an available emotion, along with the usual joy, anger, sorrow, and happiness. EveR2-Muse sang the Korean ballad "I Will Close My Eyes For You" during the opening ceremony at the Robot World 2006 conference in Seoul.

The android is about 5 ft 7 in (170 cm) tall and weighs about 135 pounds (61 kg). Its silicone-covered face has a higher flexibility; 29 motors and dozens of joints provide 23 degrees of freedom for self-expression. In total, EveR-2 has 25 more degrees of freedom than EveR-1. Its improved speech recognition, voice synthesis and gesture expression technology allows for more sophisticated communication and interaction with humans. The small CCD cameras of EveR-1 have been upgraded to Wide range Small CCD cameras (90 degrees) for better vision. While the synthetic pliable silicone jelly only covered the face and hand with soft materials of the EveR-1 (while the rest was covered with hard material), EveR-2 has its whole body covered with the soft artificial skin.

Baek Moon-hong envisions educational and entertainment functions for the androids, from providing information in department stores and museums, to reading stories to children.

== EveR-3 ==
EveR-3 (에버 3) is the successor of EveR-2, demonstrated in 2009. It is the first model in the EveR series to be mobile, using wheels for locomotion and being dressed in long skirts to hide the wheels. In early 2010 it reportedly appeared in a Korean play called Robot Princess and the Seven Dwarfs which is based on the Snow White story.

== EveR-4 ==
EveR-4 (에버4), also called EveR-4M, has a modular design with 64 degrees of freedom including 33 in the head (30 in the face and 3 in the neck), and 5 in the lower body (3 in the legs and 2 in an underlying wheel). It was exhibited at RoboWorld 2011 in Seoul, where experiments showed that some of its facial expressions are more recognisable than others, with correct recognition rate being highest among female participants in the 20-40 age range. The robot was exhibited again at Expo 2012 Yeosu Korea (May to August 2012). It has an artificial tongue, and unlike EveR-3, EveR-4 can be fitted with legs but no claim is made of it being able to walk (the wheel at the base is not usually shown on photographs).

== See also ==
- Korea University of Science and Technology
- Actroid, the first female android, with notes on Repliee R1 and Repliee Q1.
- Gynoid
- Meinü (a Chinese android)
- Android
- Robotics
- Uncanny valley
