= Agalmatophilia =

Inanimate object fetishism

- Other names: Pygmalionism
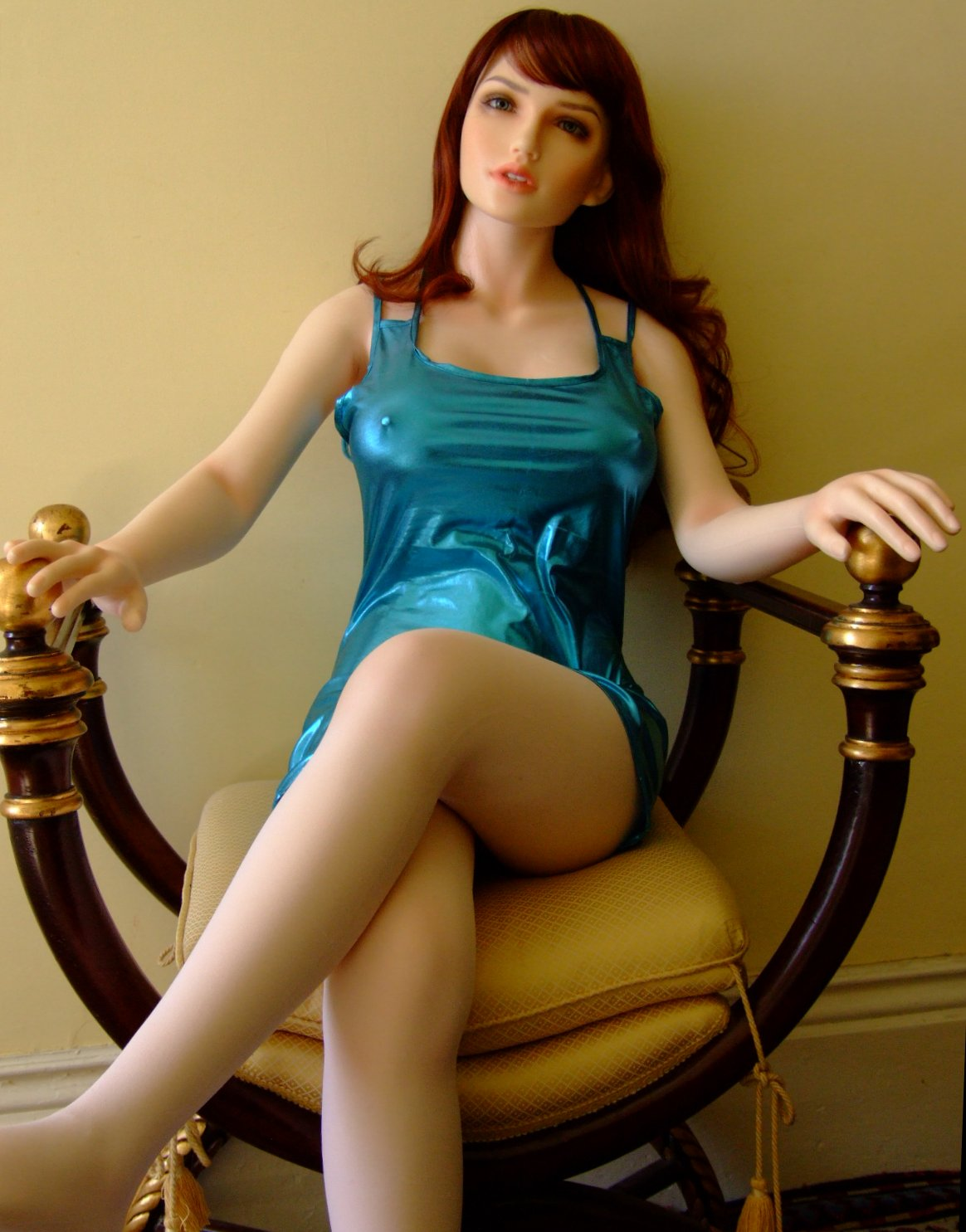
- Sex doll posed on a chair
- Specialty: Psychology, Psychiatry, Sexology, Fetishism
- Symptoms: Sexual attraction to statues, mannequins, or dolls
- Complications: Social isolation, dysfunction, legal implications (in rare cases)
- Types: Object sexuality, Erotic target location error
- Causes: Unknown; theories include early imprinting, fantasy attachment
- Risk factors: May co-occur with other paraphilias or autosexuality traits
- Differential diagnosis: Objectophilia, robot fetishism, autogynephilia
- Named after: (from Ancient Greek ἄγαλμα (ágalma) 'statue' and φιλία (philía) 'love')

Agalmatophilia (from Ancient Greek ἄγαλμα (ágalma) 'statue' and φιλία (philía) 'love') is a paraphilia involving sexual attraction to a statue, doll (doll fetishism), mannequin, or other similar figurative object. Agalmatophilia is a form of object sexuality.

The attraction may include a desire for actual sexual contact with the object, a fantasy of having sexual (or non-sexual) encounters with an animate or inanimate instance of the preferred object, the act of watching encounters between such objects, or sexual pleasure gained from thoughts of being transformed or transforming another into the preferred object.

Depending on the object of their desire, agalmatophiles can exhibit pygmalionism, the love for an object of one's own creation, named after the myth of Pygmalion, where a man falls in love with a statue he made of his ideal woman. English poet Edmund Spenser wrote of sexual pygmalionism in some of his works.

Agalmatophilia may be accompanied by other types of fetishes such as BDSM or latex.

== History ==
Though there have been stories relating to agalmatophilia since antiquity, was only referred to under the vague label "contra naturam" (lit. "aganst nature"). It would be first medically described in nineteenth-century French psychosexual pathology under the name amour des êtres inanimés or azoophilie (although these included all inanimate objects, not just statues) where it was considered more common in youth and thought to be linked to hypersexuality and, less commonly, necrophillia. Following this, it was referred to by many different names; pygmalionisme by Joris-Karl Huysmans in 1891, both Venus statuaria and Statuenliebe by Iwan Bloch in 1907, and Statuophilie in 1910. The earliest instance of the modern name is the use of agalmatofilia 1930 Italian philology.

In 1877, a gardener was recorded to have fallen in love with a statue of the Venus de Milo, and was discovered attempting coitus with it.

== Mythology ==
The most well-known myth related to an attraction to statues is the story of Pygmalion, as mentioned above. Pygmalion is said to have been disgusted with human women and carved a statue of what he considered to be the ideal woman out of ivory. He then prayed to the goddess Venus, who transformed the statue into a real woman.

The myth of Laodamia revolves around her creating a bronze statue of her husband Protesilaus after he dies in the Trojan War. This statue would be destroyed by her father Acastus when he discovered her having sexual intercourse with it.

== See also ==
- Gynoid
- Human furniture
- Living statue
- Objectum
- Robot fetishism
- Sex doll
- Sexual objectification
- Tableau vivant
