= Sex doll =

Anthropomorphic sexual device

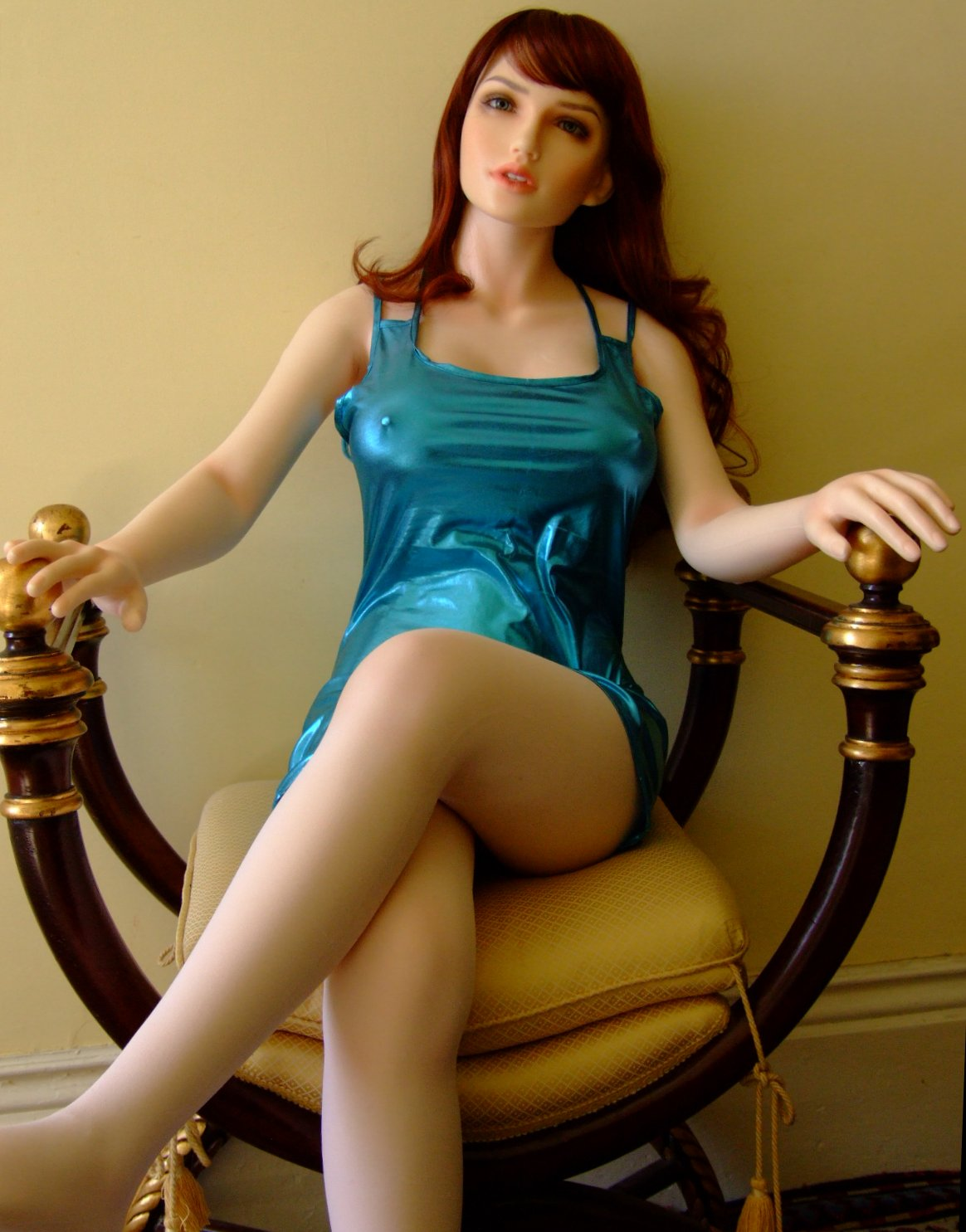
One of the first of the modern generation of realistic dolls

A sex doll (also love doll or blowup doll) is an anthropomorphic sex toy in the size and shape of a sexual partner. The sex doll may consist of an entire body, or just a head, pelvis, or other body part (vagina, anus, mouth, penis, breasts) intended for sexual stimulation. Sex dolls are made from various materials like silicone, TPE (thermoplastic elastomer), or rubber to replicate a lifelike feel. These materials are selected for their durability and realistic texture, enhancing the overall experience for users. The parts sometimes vibrate and may be moveable and interchangeable. Sex dolls exist in many forms, but are usually distinguished from sex robots, which are anthropomorphic creations designed to be able to engage in more complex interactions.

== History ==
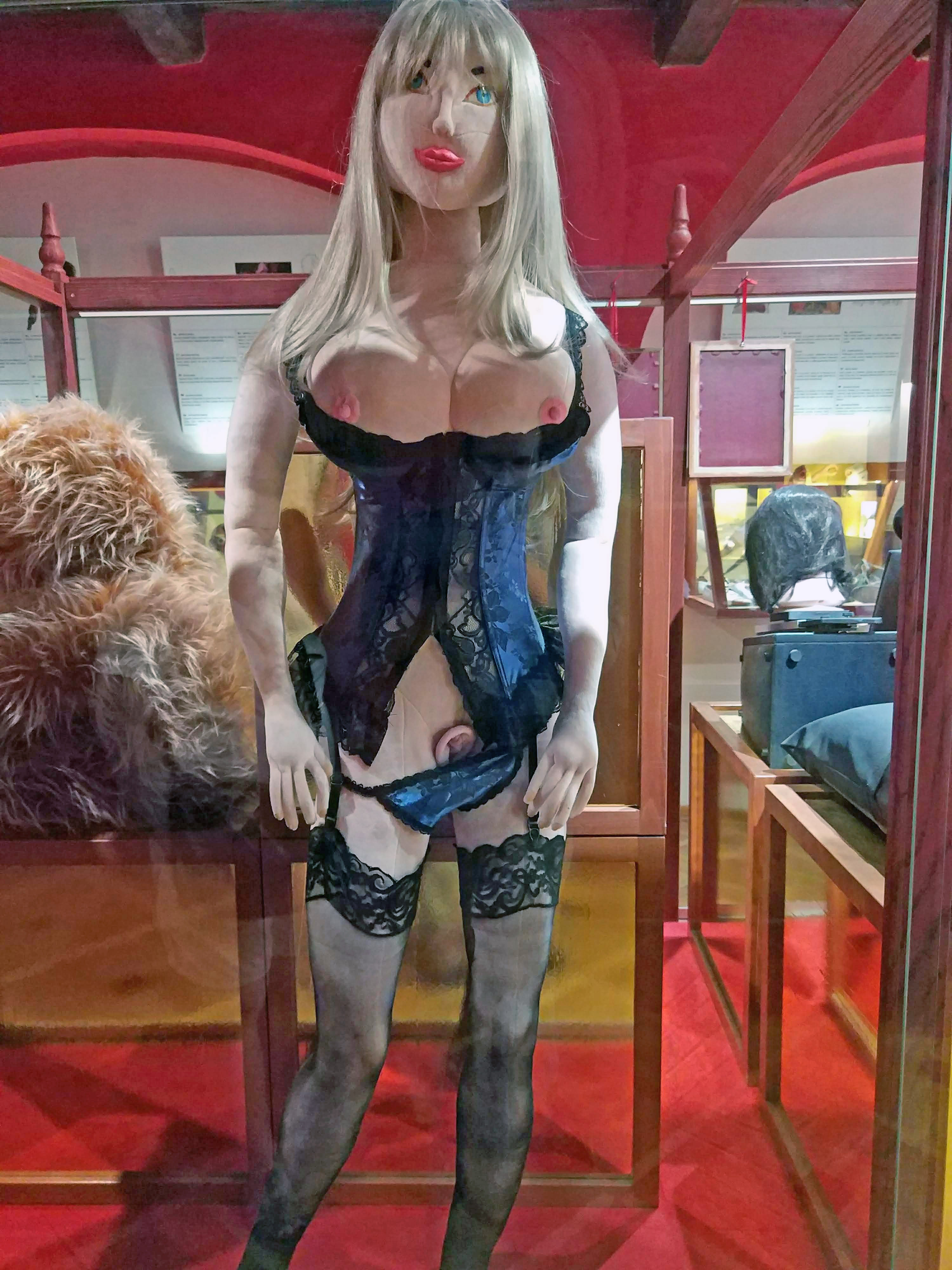
Sex doll in Sex Machines Museum, Prague

Sex dolls first appeared as consumer goods sold in France, beginning in the 1850s through rubber goods magazines as "rubber women" (femmes en caoutchouc). These early sex dolls emerged from European and American industry during the 1800s Brazilian rubber boom, alongside the invention of vulcanized rubber. The first documented appearance of these rubber sex dolls is in an article from French newspaper Le Figaro reporting from an exhibition of American rubber products at the 1855 world's fair. These goods were heavily criminalized, along with other sex toys produced in France at the time, and thus were produced and sold in small quantities at high cost.

Most longstanding myths of sex dolls' origin largely stem from one of the earliest recorded appearances of manufactured sex dolls in academic literature, which dates to 1908, in Iwan Bloch's The Sexual Life of Our Time. Bloch wrote:

In this connection, we may refer to fornicatory acts affected with artificial imitations of the human body, or of individual parts of that body. There exist true Vaucansons in this province of pornographic technology, clever mechanics who, from rubber and other plastic materials, prepare entire male or female bodies, which, as hommes or dames de voyage, subserve fornicatory purposes. More especially are the genital organs represented in a manner true to nature. Even the secretion of Bartholin's glands is imitated, by means of a "pneumatic tube" filled with oil. Similarly, by means of fluid and suitable apparatus, the ejaculation of the semen is imitated. Such artificial human beings are actually offered for sale in the catalog of certain manufacturers of "Parisian rubber articles."

— Iwan Bloch, The Sexual Life of Our Time in its Relations to Modern Civilization

Bloch's account, and those stemming from it, have been largely debunked in recent scholarship interrogating the origin of sex dolls by Bo Ruberg, which has found that this historicization relies heavily on fictional sources, namely a collection of René Schwaeblé short stories titled Les Détraquées de Paris and an erotic novel (pseudonymously written by Alphone Momas) titled La Femme endormie. The only primary sources for Blotch's claims are exaggerated advertising copy.

It has long been speculated that some of the first sex dolls were created by French (dame de voyage) and Spanish (dama de viaje) sailors in the 16th century who would be isolated during long voyages. These masturbatory dolls were reported to have often made of sewn cloth or old clothes and were a direct predecessor to today's sex dolls. The term dame de voyage, however, first appears in-use in a short story from 1893, and refers to sex workers rather than sex dolls. It is only in the 1920s that dame de voyage, without the addition of en caoutchouc (translated to 'of rubber'), comes to mean sex dolls. The first appearance of sailors making use of sex dolls comes in the 1880s, like with sex dolls more generally, in erotic literature. Rubber sex dolls are later advertised to sailors in France in the early 1900s, however there is no archival evidence for widespread practice of sex doll use at sea prior to this.

Similar to the myth of the dames de voyage origin story, the term Dutch wife has come to represent the imagined origin of sex dolls. In this narrative, the Dutch either sold dolls to Japanese people during the Rangaku period, or vice versa. This concept derives however from the more banal bamboo wife which is a cooling device historically found throughout East and Southeast Asia. This idea comes to stand in for Orientalizing and colonial fantasies of European men's sex with Asian women. The term Dutch wives is still sometimes used in Japan to refer to sex dolls.

In 1918, Austrian artist Oskar Kokoschka commissioned a life-sized doll of Alma Mahler (whom Kokoschka was in love with) to German puppet maker Hermine Moos, while he was in Dresden. Although intended to simulate Alma and receive his affection, the "Alma doll" did not satisfy Kokoschka and he destroyed it during a party.

German surrealist artist Hans Bellmer has been described as "the father figure of the modern sex doll" for his sex puppets in the 1930s whose more realistic models moved sex dolls further into the future. Bellmer made three dolls, increasingly sophisticated in design, which also made waves in the international art community.

A report that, as part of the Borghild Project, Nazi Germany made sex dolls for soldiers during World War II has not been verified by reliable sources and is now considered to be a hoax. It is however said that the commercial sex doll has its origins in Germany, especially since the creation of the Bild Lilli doll in the 1950s, which was in turn the inspiration for creating the famous Barbie doll.

The production of human simulacra to substitute for human sexual partners took several technological leaps forward in the late 20th century. By the 1970s, vinyl, latex and silicone had become the materials most frequently used in the manufacture of sex dolls; silicone, in particular, allowed a greater degree of realism.

A 1982 attempt to import a consignment of sex dolls into Britain had the unintended consequence of ending the law against importing "obscene or indecent" items that were not illegal to sell within the UK. Having had the dolls seized by Her Majesty's Customs and Excise officers, David Sullivan's Conegate Ltd. took the case all the way to the European Court of Justice, and won in 1987. Britain was forced to lift its stringent import prohibitions dating from 1876 because for imports from within the European Community they constituted a barrier to free trade under the terms of the Treaty of Rome.

Shin Takagi, founder of the company Trottla, manufactures lifelike child sex dolls in the belief that doing so provides a safe and legal outlet for men expressing pedophilic desires. This has been disputed by paraphilia researcher Peter J. Fagan, who argues that contact with the products would likely have a reinforcing effect, increasing the risk of pedophilic action being taken. Since 2013, Australian officials have confiscated imported shipments of juvenile sex dolls legally classified as child exploitation material.

Sales of sex dolls increased significantly during the COVID-19 pandemic.

== Contemporary commercial forms ==
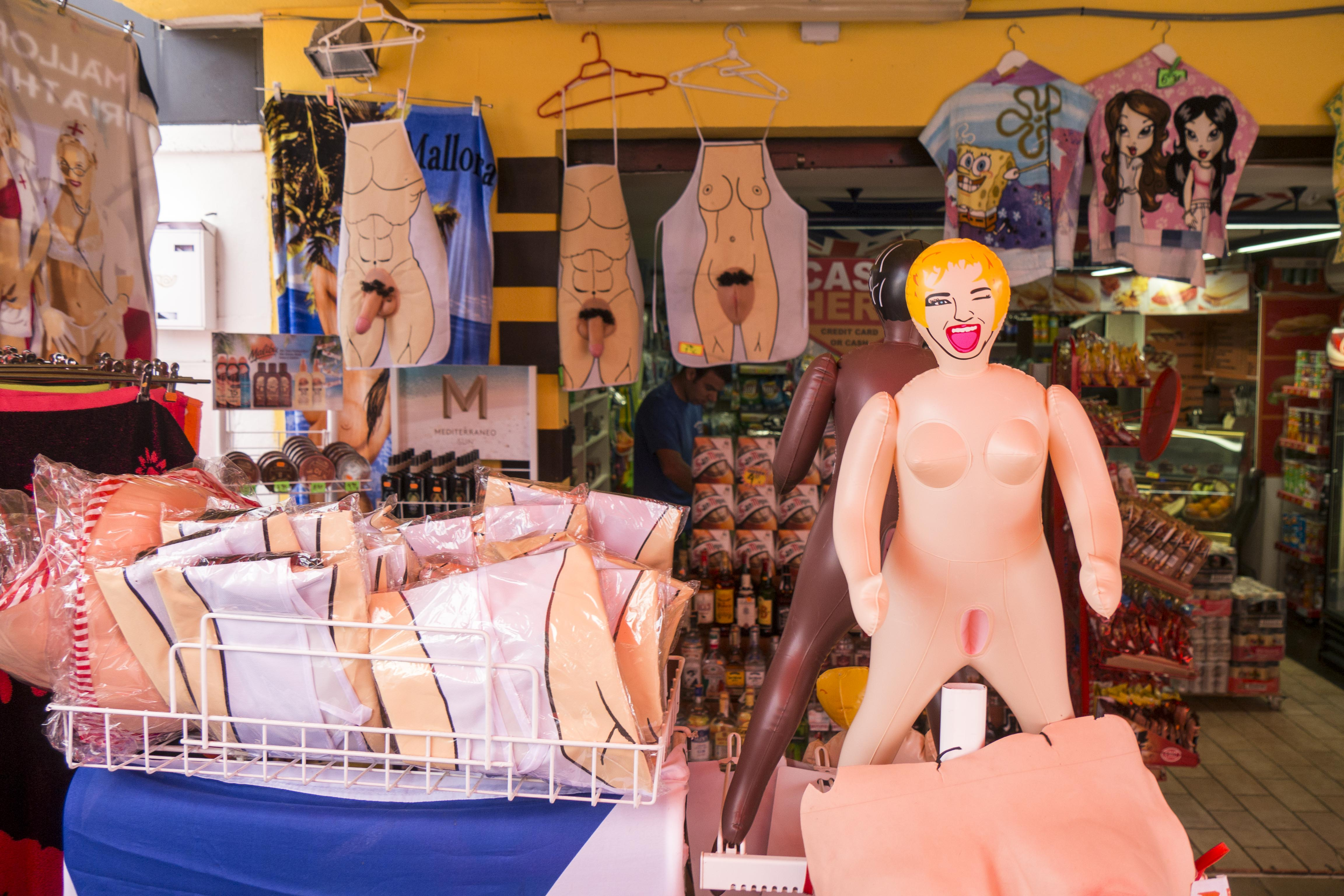
Inflatable sex dolls on display in a shop alongside other sexual novelty items

Cheaper sex dolls are inflatable, using air. These dolls, representing the lowest price range (less than US$75), are usually made of welded vinyl and bear only a passing resemblance to actual people. They have an artificial and typically crudely designed vagina or penis, but due to their affordability, many users are willing to overlook their shortcomings. They often burst at the seams after a few uses, although they are commonly given as gag gifts and therefore many may not be used at all. In Russia, for some years the Bubble Baba Challenge humorously featured participants river rafting on blowup dolls as a form of entertainment, but in 2013 the race was canceled on "health and safety" grounds.

At the middle market price range ($100 to approximately $1,000), dolls are made of thicker vinyl or heavy latex without welded seams or a polyurethane and silicone mixture, typically surrounding a foam core. Most have plastic mannequin-style heads and styled wigs, plastic or glass eyes, and occasionally properly molded hands and feet. Some vinyl dolls can contain water-filled body areas such as the breasts or buttocks. Latex dolls were made in Hungary, China and France but only the French manufacturer Domax now remains in production.

The manufacturing process causes most latex dolls to be delivered with a fine coating of zinc oxide covering the skin, which is usually removed by the consumer by placing the doll under the shower. Otherwise, latex is an inert and non-toxic natural material; although a small percentage of users may discover a latex allergy.

The most expensive sex dolls (approximately $1,200 and up) are usually made from silicone (usually above $3,000 at 2016 prices) or thermoplastic elastomer known as TPE. As of 2023 pricing of the dolls on eBay ranges from $200 to $1000 for high quality full size full body TPE dolls. The most prevalent factors governing price are size, weight, and aesthetics. Pricing loosely follows $5 per pound. Some popular models beginning price at $500 have risen in price to as much as $1000. Scaled down size full body TPE mini dolls, full size torsos, and other body parts range in price from under $100 to $300. Dolls made of either material can be very lifelike, with faces and bodies modeled on real people in some instances, with realistic skin material (similar to that used for movie special effects), and with realistic (or even real) hair. These dolls usually have an articulated PVC or metal skeleton with flexible joints that allow them to be positioned in a variety of positions for display and for sexual acts. Silicone or TPE dolls are much heavier than vinyl or latex inflatable ones (which consist mostly of air), but are roughly half the weight of a real human being of comparable size.

Because of their ability to be posed in different positions silicone dolls are popular with artists and photographers as models.

In Japan, sex dolls are known as "Dutch wives" (ダッチワイフ, datchi waifu), which now refers to relatively inexpensive dolls. Their name originates from the term, possibly English, for the thick rattan or bamboo bolster, used to aid sleep in humid countries by keeping one's limbs lifted above sweaty sheets. Orient Industry is considered to be the leading manufacturer of high-end silicone dolls in Japan, which started using another term "love dolls" (ラブドール, rabu dōru) around 1998 to distinguish their dolls from the image of inflatable dolls associated with the term "Dutch wife". The term has stuck and is now used generally to refer to any high-end product. One business, Doru no Mori (Doll Forest) in Tokyo, rents love dolls and rooms to male customers. In March 2007 the Japanese daily Mainichi Shimbun newspaper reported that there are also rental businesses that bring the dolls to the customer's home, and that the specialist love-doll magazine i-doloid has a print-run of 10,000 copies per issue.

The middle market and high-end market emerged in the US around 1992. The market has grown for two reasons. Firstly, the last twenty years have seen huge improvements over earlier types of sex dolls, as customers havecome to realize this through using the web. Secondly, the method of retail purchase has improved, now showing customers what the actual doll, seams, hair, and even orifices look like.

In China the market has mushroomed on account of the demographic effects of the one-child policy and accordingly numerous new Chinese manufacturers have appeared in recent years.

== Non-standard forms ==
In Japan one can purchase inflatable or stuffed love pillows or dakimakura that can be fitted with a cover printed with a life-size picture of a porn star or anime character. Other less common novelty love dolls include overweight, intersex, and alien dolls, which are usable for pleasure but also tend to be given as gag gifts.

Some companies manufacture cloth sex dolls using the same technology that is used to create plush toys. With widespread cultural use of the internet amongst younger generations, numerous forums exist for amateurs who create their own sex dolls from fabric or other materials. There are even mailing lists for discussing techniques and experiences with MLDs (material love dolls).

Some inflatable sex dolls are made in the form of animals, most notably sheep and cows. These dolls are more of a joke gift or party novelty and are often not suitable for sexual use.

== New materials and technologies ==
Chinese silicone sex doll

Silicone dolls were at first made from tin-cure silicone but platinum technology has better longevity, less prone to tears and compression marks. For this reason, the "RealDoll" manufacturer reported switching from the tin to the platinum material in June 2009 and all other manufacturers have followed suit.

Since 2012 or so, a thermoplastic elastomer alternative known as TPE has come into common use particularly by Chinese manufacturers which have enabled realistic dolls to be made which are cheaper than those composed of the high quality expensive platinum cure silicone.

Matrix dolls used an elastic gel, which they claimed to be superior to silicone in elasticity, shape memory, and durability. Both this company and the company "First Androids" once offered pelvic thruster motor, audio capability, and heated orifices, though these options are no longer available. Several modern doll manufacturers now offer the last option on their silicone dolls, with the addition of an internal heating system.

Foam dolls have now become available from sEX Doll and SeeDree dolls, in hope of making Sex Dolls a lighter weight. Cloud Climax reports that they can be as low as 9 kg, whilst being a life-sized doll and that the heads are silicone for realism.

== Legal restrictions and issues ==
In 2019, the Israeli media reported on an incident where a European sex dolls company created a sex doll that is based on the Israeli model, Yael Cohen Aris, without her permission. In 2020, the same story was further investigated and reported by Playboy, and was mentioned in relation to Deepfake.

=== Austria ===
As prostitution is legalized and regulated, there are no legal restrictions concerning sex dolls in Austria and numerous brothels are offering sex dolls for clients. Although sex dolls originally started appearing in Austria around 1980, they gained popularity in 2017 when a brothel started offering sex doll services to clients. This can be attributed to the fact that the dolls have become more realistic in recent years.

In addition to being able to have intercourse with the sex doll, some places allow clients to purchase sex dolls for themselves. One of the biggest laufhauses in Vienna offers sex in the laufhaus with dolls alongside real women.

According to brothel owners who offer sex dolls, the dolls are being properly cleaned after every session. Unprotected sex with sex dolls is also allowed, but it is not advised as there is no guarantee that the dolls are being cleaned after each client.

=== Botswana ===
The importation of sex dolls for men has been banned in Botswana according to Section 178 of the Botswana Penal Code. The law further abolishes the right to "possess, lend, trade-in, export, import, and or exhibit obscene objects or any objects tending to corrupt morals in Botswana", which includes sex dolls.

=== China ===
In China, it is legal to buy and use sex dolls. In 2020, sex doll experience halls appeared in many cities in China.

=== Myanmar (Burma) ===
In Myanmar, it was highly publicly criticized on October 22, 2022, when people paid obeisance to two China-made silicone sex dolls as the two goddesses Thurathadi and Thiri Devi at the Shwedagon Pagoda. The dolls are owned by an alchemist named Inn Weizzamo. He bought the dolls from China for US$2,400 each, and worshiped them by dressing in royal clothes. On the same day, he was arrested for allegedly causing harm to Buddhism.

The sayadaw Min Thunya (Buddhist University) says that "the act of worshiping two silicone sex dolls in the form of two noble goddesses is an insult to the religion. It's really shameful."

=== South Korea ===
In 2018, the South Korean Supreme Court ruled to legalize the sale of sex dolls. The issue still remains controversial in the country.

=== United Kingdom ===
It is illegal to import sex dolls that look like children into the United Kingdom, and the offence carries up to seven years in prison under several acts, one of which is an 1876 customs act governing the importation of obscene articles. However, the law is not specific on what constitutes a child sex doll and as such all sex dolls are technically illegal until decided otherwise by a border agent upon importation and inspection. The only guidelines known by vendors are to ensure the doll is taller than 140 centimetres (4 ft 7 in) and this can be observed on UK websites since dolls below this height are not available. Other factors that may affect the outcome of a case are the size of the breasts and subjective opinions about the age that the face appears.

=== United States ===
Sex dolls that look like children have been banned from Florida, Kentucky, Tennessee, South Dakota, and Hawaii.

== Sex robots ==
In June 2006, Henrik Christensen of the European Robotics Research Network told the UK's Sunday Times that "people are going to be having sex with robots within five years." This belief is due to several perceived benefits from creating and using such devices.

Reacting to the ongoing development of "sex robots" or "sexbots", in September 2015, Kathleen Richardson of De Montfort University and Erik Billing of the University of Skövde created the Campaign Against Sex Robots, calling for a ban on the creation of anthropomorphic sex robots. They argue that the introduction of such devices would be socially harmful, and demeaning to women and children.

=== Debates over sex dolls and robots ===
The emergence of sex dolls and robots has raised ethical concerns and sparked debates among people. Some argue that they promote sexist objectification and should not be developed or used at all. Others suggest that, if designed ethically, sex robots can have positive effects on individual and social well-being. This would involve safeguarding advanced sentient robots with robocentric ethics and obtaining explicit consent for sexual interaction. Despite these considerations, ethical questions surrounding robot prostitution remain unresolved and continue to fuel debate.

== State of research ==
Compared to pornography for which thousands, and compared to sex robots for which dozens of scientific studies are available, sex dolls, their use and effects have been relatively little researched so far. This is not surprising because sex dolls are a subtype of sex toys, and sex toys as material sexual objects are fairly under-researched in general.

Nevertheless, a systematic review from the year 2020 was able to identify 29 published academic studies on sex dolls. These sex doll studies deal with the following five research questions:

1. What are appropriate theoretical conceptualizations of sex dolls?
2. How are sex dolls represented in art and media?
3. What empirical findings on the use and effect of sex dolls are available through interviews, surveys or analyses of sex doll online forums?
4. What therapeutic uses and effects of sex dolls are documented in clinical case studies?
5. Should there be a legal regulation of child sex dolls, and if yes, why and how?

Overall, the current state of research shows that sex doll owners (so far, the majority are men) and their uses are diverse and that sex dolls can be associated with negative and positive effects. Likewise, the available empirical studies with sex doll owners indicate that they do not only regard and treat their dolls as "sex" dolls, but sometimes also as "love" dolls or social companions. A clinical case study explained how living with a doll helped a divorced man to overcome relationship trauma and get ready to approach real women again. Psychological theories that can explain the human-doll relationship are, among others, the theory of transitional objects or the theory of parasocial interactions and relationships usually applied to media personas.

In the 2023 study "Exploring the Psychological Characteristics and Risk-related Cognitions of Individuals Who Own Sex Dolls" the authors point out that there is concern that sex doll ownership increases negative social attitudes towards women and the risk of sexual offenses. However, the study found no scientific evidence for this, but rather that doll owners were less likely to commit sexually aggressive acts towards women. Doll owners also tended to view women as "unknowable" and tended to have lower self-esteem.

== In popular culture ==
In the BBC programme Desert Island Discs, aired since 1942 with little interruption, guests were also permitted to bring either a book or a "luxury" in addition to musical recordings. Several chose life-size dolls: Oliver Reed, Ronnie Scott (who settled instead for a saxophone), and Duncan Carse.

The narrator of Italian writer Tommaso Landolfi's comedic short story "Gogol's Wife" describes several visits to the subject of his biography, Nikolai Gogol. At that renowned 19th century Russian writer's residence, the future biographer finds Gogol, referred to throughout as Nikolai Vassilevitch (his personal name and patronymic), with a life-size, anatomically correct blow-up doll. In later visits, via magical realism, the doll is described with more and more human attributes.

Lars and the Real Girl, a 2007 American dramedy concerns the title character openly having a "relationship" with a RealDoll.

In another film, SottoCoperta, the protagonist, Matrona tries to spread the use of sex dolls in Naples in order to fight prostitution.

The song Rubber Doll (Opus) by Lords of Acid off the album Our Little Secret features lyrics centered on the narrator's frustration with their partner cheating on them with a sex doll named Sex Bomb Annie. It was the lead single for the album, and was featured on certain modern rock radio stations late-night rotations, one example including the station KTCL.

== See also ==
- Agalmatophilia
- Artificial vagina
- RealDoll
- Doll fetish
- Gynoid
- List of inflatable manufactured goods
- Object sexuality
- Robot fetishism
- Sex machine
- Uncanny valley
- Xdolls

== Bibliography ==
- Alexandre, Elisabeth. Des Poupées et des hommes — enquete sur l'amour Artif. (2005). ISBN 2-84271-252-8 (Book is in French - 'Dolls and Men — Investigation into Artificial Love').
- Dorfman, Elana. Still Lovers (2005). ISBN 0-9766708-1-X. (Female art/fashion photographer photographs men and their dolls).
- Guys and Dolls: Art, Science, Fashion, and relationships. Royal Pavilion, Libraries, and Museums. (2005). (102-page catalog of a major exhibition at Brighton Museum and Art Gallery, England).
- Moya, Cynthia Ann. (2006) "Artificial Vaginas and Sex Dolls: An Erotological Investigation." Dissertation, San Francisco, CA: Institute for Advanced Study of Human Sexuality. Available in hardcopy or CD-ROM.
