= Gynoid =

Humanoid robot resembling a woman

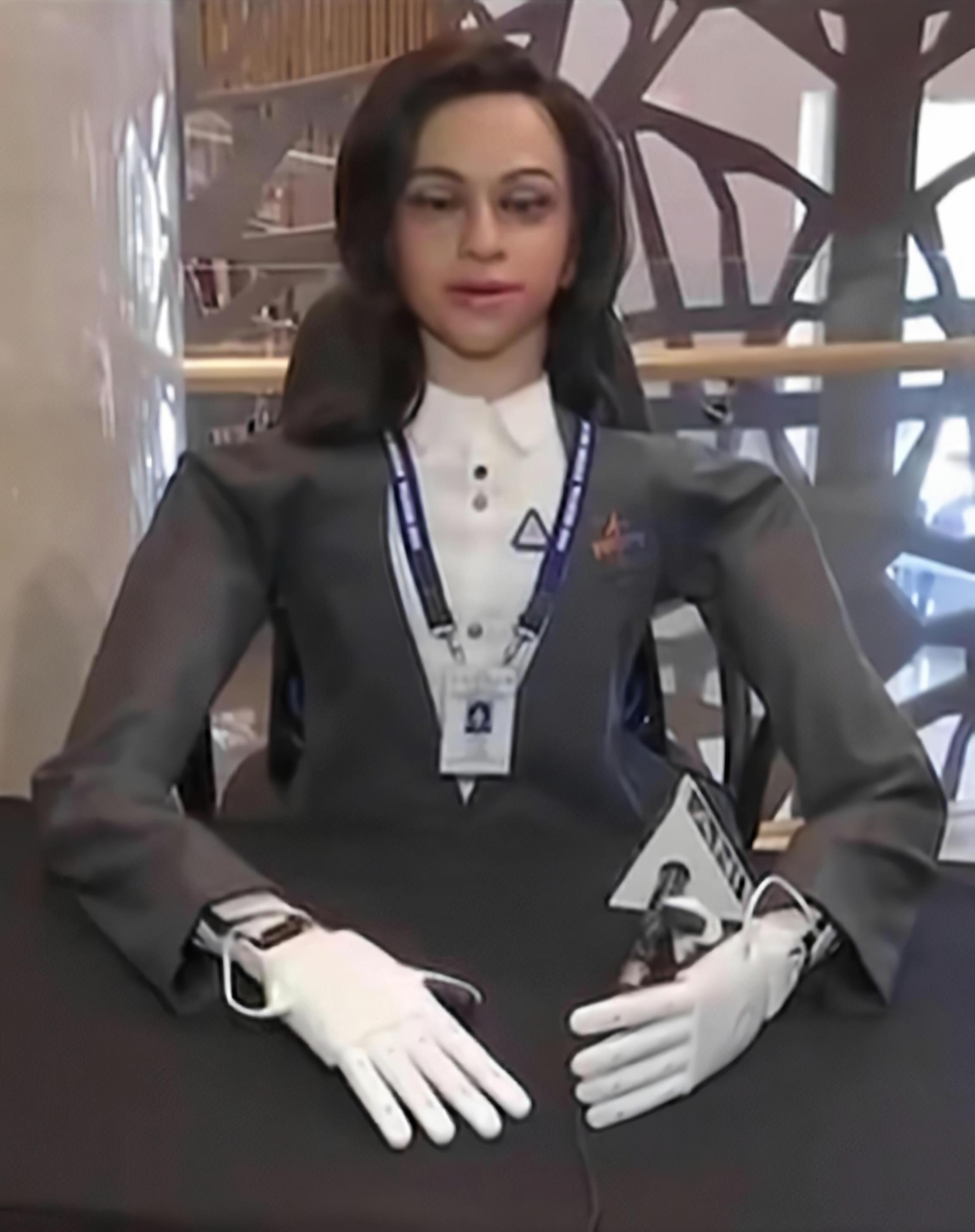
Vyommitra (Indian Space Research Organisation, 2020)

A gynoid, robotess, or fembot is a feminine humanoid robot. The depiction of gynoids in science fiction films and artwork is a noted cultural phenomenon, with questions being posed about sexualization and use as sex objects. As the design of more realistic humanoid robots becomes technologically possible, gynoids are also emerging in real-life robotic applications.

== Name ==
The adjective gynoid means "resembling or pertaining to the female human form". Though the term android has been used to refer to robotic humanoids regardless of apparent gender, the Greek prefix "andr-" refers to man in the masculine sense.

The term gynoid was first used by Isaac Asimov in a 1979 editorial, as a theoretical female equivalent of the word android.

Other possible names for feminine robots exist. The portmanteau "fembot" (feminine or female robot) was used as far back as 1959, in Fritz Leiber's The Silver Eggheads, applying specifically to non-sentient female sexbots. It was popularized by the television series The Bionic Woman in the episode "Kill Oscar" (1976) and later used in the Austin Powers films, among others. "Robotess" is the oldest female-specific term, originating in 1921 from Rossum's Universal Robots, the same source as the term "robot".

== Feminine robots ==
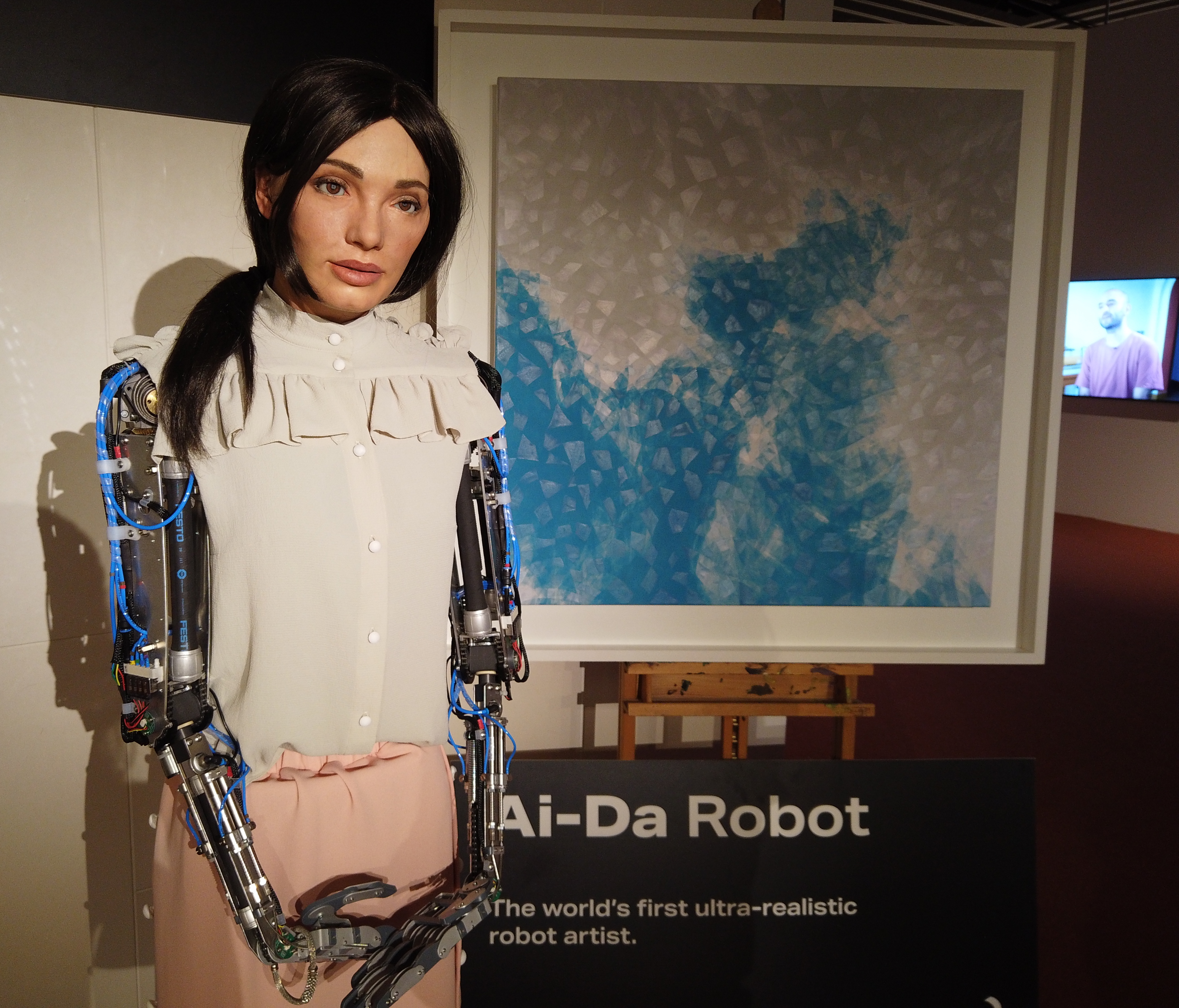
Ai-Da, the gynoid artist, at Abu Dhabi Art (2019)

...the great majority of robots were either machine-like, male-like or child-like for the reasons that not only are virtually all roboticists male, but also that fembots posed greater technical difficulties. Not only did the servo motor and platform have to be 'interiorized' (naizō suru), but the body [of the fembot] needed to be slender, both extremely difficult undertakings.
—Tomotaka Takahashi, roboticist

Examples of notable feminine robots include:

- EveR-1
- Actroid, designed by Hiroshi Ishiguro to be "a perfect secretary who smiles and flutters her eyelids"
- HRP-4C
- Meinü robot
- Ai-Da, a robot art system embodied as a humanoid robot.
- Vyommitra (Sanskrit: Vyōma 'space', Mitra 'friend') is a female humanoid robot designed for space travel. She was developed by the Indian Space Research Organisation (ISRO) to function aboard the spacecraft Gaganyaan, a crewed orbital spacecraft.

Researchers note the connection between the design of feminine robots and roboticists' assumptions about gendered appearance and labor. Fembots in Japan, for example, are designed with slenderness and grace in mind, and they are employed to help to maintain traditional family structures and politics in a nation of population decline.

People's reactions to fembots are also attributable to gender stereotypes. Research in this area is aimed at elucidating gender cues, clarifying which behaviors and aesthetics elicit a stronger gender-induced response.

=== Sexualization ===
"Sweetheart", shown with its creator, Clayton Bailey; the feminine robot (also a functional coffee maker) created a controversy in 1983 after it was displayed at the Lawrence Hall of Science at University of California, Berkeley.

Gynoids may be "eroticized", and some examples such as Aiko include sensitivity sensors in their breasts and genitals to facilitate sexual response. The fetishization of gynoids in real life has been attributed to male desires for custom-made passive women and compared to life-size sex dolls. However, some science fiction works depict them as femmes fatales, fighting the establishment or being rebellious.

In 1983, a female robot named "Sweetheart" was removed from a display at the Lawrence Hall of Science; the robot's breasts, perceived as an exaggerated feature, resulted in a petition being presented claiming it was insulting to women. The robot's creator, Clayton Bailey, a professor of art at California State University, Hayward called this "censorship" and "next to book burning".

== In fiction ==
The theme of the artificial woman has a long history in both fiction and mythology, dating back to the ancient Greeks, as exemplified by the myth of Pygmalion. In science fiction, the depiction of female-appearance robots is often characterized by their use as domestic servants or sexual slaves. This trope is exemplified in various literary and cinematic works, including the film Westworld (1978), the novel Fairyland (1995) by Paul J. McAuley, and the short story "Helen O'Loy" (1938) by Lester del Rey. These robots have sometimes also been depicted as warriors, killers, or laborers. The character of Annalee Call in Alien Resurrection is a rare example of a non-sexualized gynoid. In Xenosaga, a role-playing video game, the character "KOS-MOS" is a female armored android.

=== The perfect woman ===
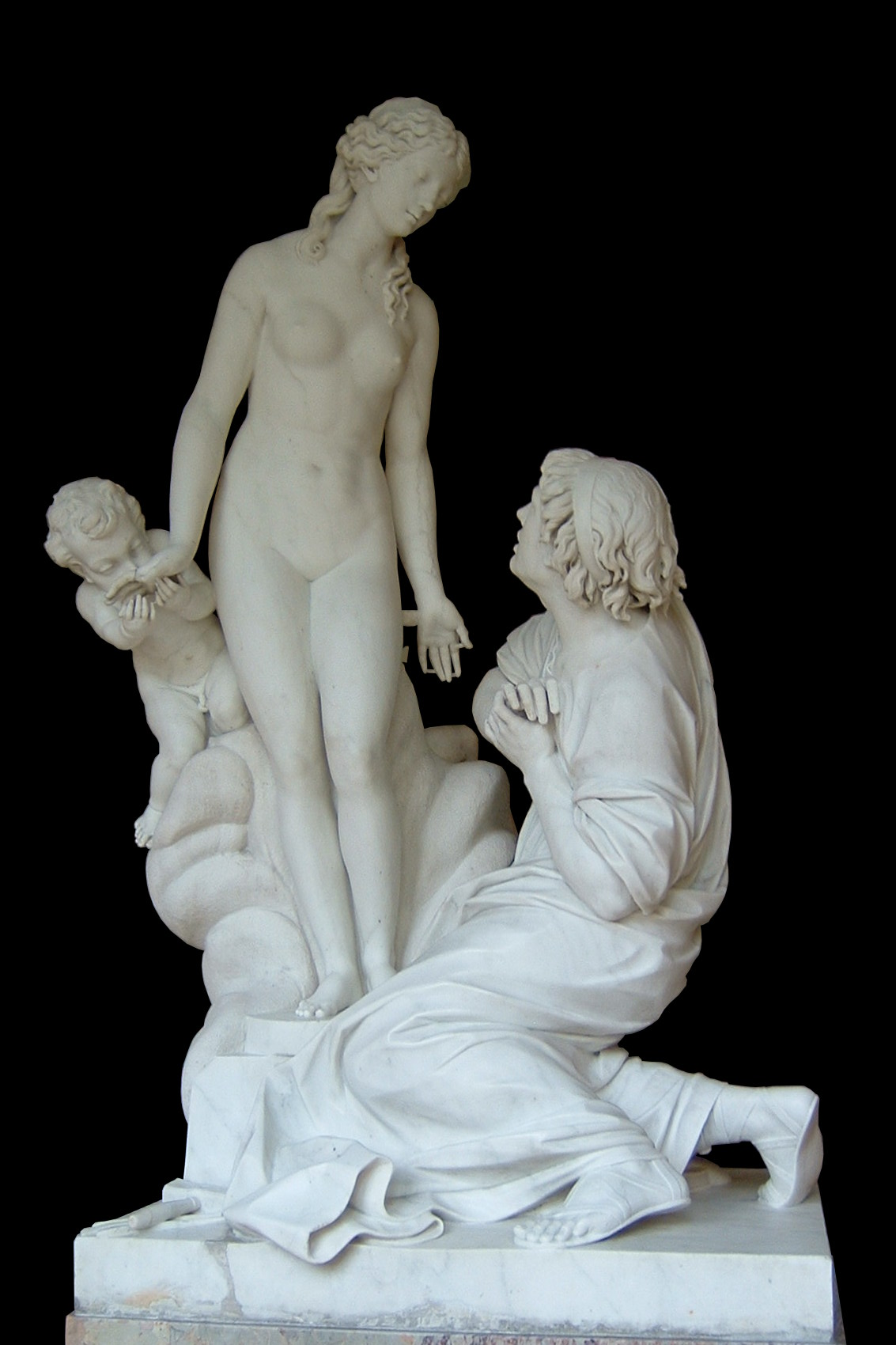
Étienne Maurice Falconet: Pygmalion et Galatée (1763). Although not robotic, Galatea's inorganic origin has led to comparisons with gynoids.

A long tradition exists in literature of the construction of an artificial embodiment of a certain type of ideal woman, and fictional gynoids have been seen as an extension of this theme. Examples include Hephaestus in the Iliad who created female servants of metal, and Ilmarinen in the Kalevala who created an artificial wife. Pygmalion, from Ovid's account, is one of the earliest conceptualizations of constructions similar to gynoids in literary history. In this myth a female statue is sculpted that is so beautiful that the creator falls in love with it, and after he prays to Aphrodite, the goddess takes pity on him and converts the statue into a real woman, Galatea, with whom Pygmalion has children.

The Maschinenmensch ("machine-human"), also called "Parody," "Futura," "Robotrix," or the "Maria impersonator," in Fritz Lang's Metropolis is the first example of gynoid in film: a femininely shaped robot is given skin so that she is not known to be a robot and successfully impersonates the imprisoned Maria and works convincingly as an exotic dancer.

Fictional gynoids are often unique products made to fit a particular man's desire, as seen in the novel Tomorrow's Eve and films The Perfect Woman, The Stepford Wives, Mannequin and Weird Science, and the creators are often male "mad scientists" such as the characters Rotwang in Metropolis, Tyrell in Blade Runner, and the husbands in The Stepford Wives. Gynoids have been described as the "ultimate geek fantasy: a metal-and-plastic woman of your own."

The Bionic Woman television series popularized the word fembot. These fembots were a line of powerful, lifelike gynoids with the faces of protagonist Jaime Sommers's best friends. They fought in two multi-part episodes of the series: "Kill Oscar" and "Fembots in Las Vegas," and despite the feminine prefix, there were also male versions, including some designed to impersonate particular individuals for the purpose of infiltration. While not truly artificially intelligent, the fembots still had extremely sophisticated programming that allowed them to pass for human in most situations. The term fembot was also used in Buffy the Vampire Slayer.

The 1987 science-fiction film Cherry 2000 portrayed a gynoid character which was described by the male protagonist as his "perfect partner". The 1964 TV series My Living Doll features a robot, portrayed by Julie Newmar, who is similarly described. The film Her (2013) portrays a virtual assistant, Samantha, with whom the protagonist, Theodore, develops a romantic relationship. However, as Samantha's intelligence surpasses human comprehension, she leaves to pursue her higher purpose.

A recent example can be seen in the 2015 science-fiction film Ex Machina, directed by Alex Garland. The film featured a genius inventor experimenting with gynoids in an attempt to create the perfect companion.

=== Gender ===
Fiction about gynoids or female cyborgs reinforce essentialist ideas of femininity, according to Margret Grebowicz. Such essentialist ideas may present as sexual or gender stereotypes. Among the few non-eroticized fictional gynoids include Rosie the Robot Maid from The Jetsons. However, she still has some stereotypical feminine qualities, such as a matronly shape and a predisposition to cry.

Exaggeratedly feminine fembots with guns in their breasts, from the film Austin Powers: International Man of Mystery

The stereotypical role of wifedom has also been explored through use of gynoids. In The Stepford Wives, husbands are shown as desiring to restrict the independence of their wives, and obedient and stereotypical spouses are preferred. The husbands' technological method of obtaining this "perfect wife" is through the murder of their human wives and replacement with gynoid substitutes that are compliant and housework obsessed, resulting in a "picture-postcard" perfect suburban society. This has been seen as an allegory of male chauvinism of the period, by representing marriage as a master-slave relationship, and an attempt at raising feminist consciousness during the era of second wave feminism.

In a parody of the fembots from The Bionic Woman, attractive, blonde fembots in alluring baby-doll nightgowns were used as a lure for the fictional agent Austin Powers in the movie Austin Powers: International Man of Mystery. The film's sequels had cameo appearances of characters revealed as fembots.

Jack Halberstam writes that these gynoids inform the viewer that femaleness does not indicate naturalness, and their exaggerated femininity and sexuality is used in a similar way to the title character's exaggerated masculinity, lampooning stereotypes.

=== Sex objects ===
Some argue that gynoids have often been portrayed as sexual objects. Female cyborgs have been similarly used in fiction, in which natural bodies are modified to become objects of fantasy. The female robot in visual media has been described as "the most visible linkage of technology and sex" by Steven Heller.

Feminist critic Patricia Melzer writes in Alien Constructions: Science Fiction and Feminist Thought that gynoids in Richard Calder's Dead Girls are inextricably linked to men's lust, and are mainly designed as sex objects, having no use beyond "pleasing men's violent sexual desires." The gynoid character Eve from the film Eve of Destruction has been described as "a literal sex bomb," with her subservience to patriarchal authority and a bomb in place of reproductive organs. In the 1949 film The Perfect Woman, the titular robot, Olga, is described as having "no sex," but Steve Chibnall writes in his essay "Alien Women" in British Science Fiction Cinema that it is clear from her fetishistic underwear that she is produced as a toy for men, with an "implicit fantasy of a fully compliant sex machine." In the film Westworld, female robots actually engaged in intercourse with human men as part of the make-believe vacation world human customers paid to attend.

Sexual interest in gynoids and fembots has been attributed to fetishisation of technology, and compared to sadomasochism in that it reorganizes the social risk of sex. The depiction of female robots minimizes the threat felt by men from female sexuality and allow the "erasure of any social interference in the spectator's erotic enjoyment of the image." Gynoid fantasies are produced and collected by online communities centered around chat rooms and web site galleries.

Isaac Asimov writes that his robots were generally sexually neutral and that giving the majority masculine names was not an attempt to comment on gender. He first wrote about female-appearing robots at the request of editor Judy-Lynn del Rey. Asimov's short story "Feminine Intuition" (1969) is an early example that showed gynoids as being as capable and versatile as male robots, with no sexual connotations. Early models in "Feminine Intuition" were "female caricatures," used to highlight their human creators' reactions to the idea of female robots. Later models lost obviously feminine features, but retained "an air of femininity."

== Criticisms ==
Critics have commented on the problematic nature of assigning a gender to an artificial object with no consciousness of its own, based purely on its appearance or sound. It has also been argued that innovations should part from this essentialising notion of a woman and focus on the purpose of creating robots, without making them explicitly male or female. Very few robots are explicitly assigned the male gender, contributing to the male default narrative. Critics have also noticed how the creation of gynoids is associated with service roles, while androids or systems with male voices are employed in positions of leadership.

== See also ==
- Actroid – Type of android
- Android – Robot resembling a human
- Cyborg – Being with both organic and biomechatronic body parts
- Ex Machina (film) – 2014 film by Alex Garland
- Ghost in the Shell 2: Innocence – 2004 film by Mamoru Oshii
- The Future Eve – 1880 novel by Auguste Villiers de L'Isle-Adam
- Gender in speculative fiction
- List of fictional gynoids
- The Machine (2013 film) – 2013 science fiction film directed by Caradog W. James
- Robot fetishism – Fetishistic attraction to humanoid robots
- Sex doll – Anthropomorphic sexual device
  - Sex robot – Anthropomorphic robot sex doll
- Sophia (robot) – Social humanoid robot
- Uncanny valley – Hypothesis that human replicas elicit revulsion
