= Tico Robot =

Spanish social robot

Tico
- Manufacturer: Adele Robots
- Year of creation: 2007
- Website: www.adelerobots.com/en/tico

Tico is a social robot developed by Adele Robots to interact with humans in different environments, primarily promotional events and in education as a helper for teachers.

== History ==
Initially created by Treelogic in 2007 as a research platform for Human-Robot Interaction, it participated in several R&D projects such as ACROSS, and was also tested in supermarkets and schools. It became commercially available in 2010.

== Design ==
The first version included a laser rangefinder and ultrasonic sensors for obstacle detection, and a camera for tracking people and reading QR codes. It also has a touch screen. Its head and neck access 6 degrees of freedom. It moves using differential steering with two high-torque EC gear-motors, and runs Ubuntu 9.10 on a 1.6 GHz Intel Core Duo. It stands 1.5 metres (4 ft 11 in) tall and weighs 85 kilograms (187 lb). A new, fresh battery allows it to run freely for eight hours.

== Tico usage ==
Tico was tested as a pedagogic tool for teachers to improve children's motivation and gain their attention.

== See also ==
- Kismet
- Joe Robot
