= Furhat =

Social robot

- Manufacturer: Furhat Robotics
- Country: Sweden
- Year of creation: 2014
- Type: Social robot

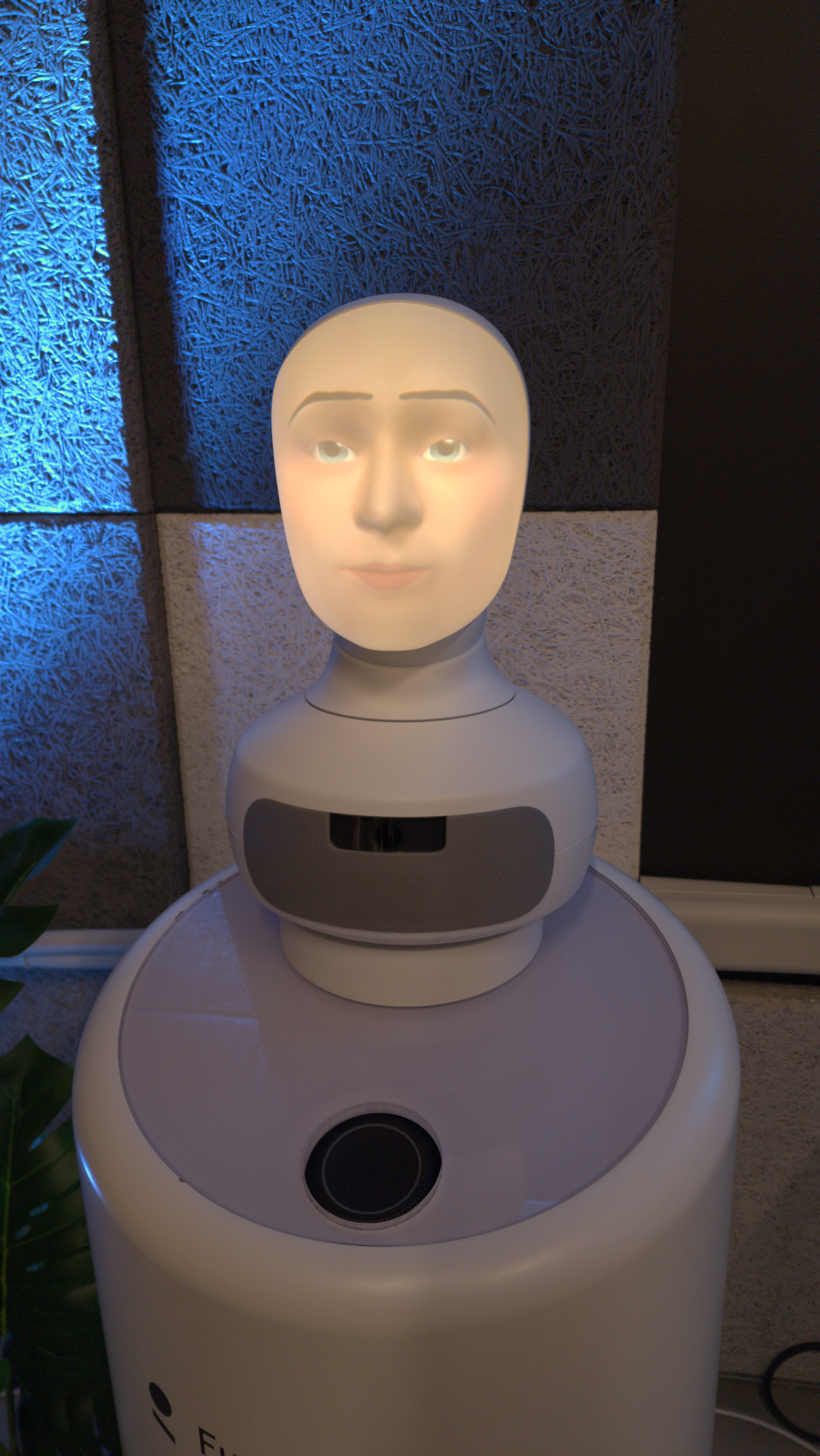
A talking robot head called Furhat.

Furhat is a social humanoid robot made by the Swedish company Furhat Robotics. It is a table-top bust with a translucent mask onto which an animated face is back-projected. Furhat uses speech recognition and speech synthesis to hold spoken conversations. It is used mainly as a research platform in human–robot interaction, and has also been deployed in recruitment, transport and healthcare settings.

Furhat Robotics was founded by Samer Al Moubayed.

== Design ==
A projector inside the head displays the face onto the mask from behind. Because the face is projected rather than built from motors, the robot can switch between faces and expressions without mechanical actuators. Its computer vision software detects and tracks faces in view and can follow several people at once.

The hardware consists of a motorised neck, a wide-angle camera, stereo microphones and a speaker. The robot can change facial expression, head orientation, gaze direction and eyebrow position during a conversation.

== Software ==
Furhat Robotics supplies a software development kit (SDK) and developer tools for the robot. Applications are written in a Kotlin-based domain-specific language that supports dialogue flows and intent recognition. The SDK includes a simulator of the robot's face and behaviour for testing without the hardware. A remote API lets external programs written in Python, C# or JavaScript control the robot over a network. Developers have connected it to external services such as Amazon Polly and ElevenLabs, and researchers at Heriot-Watt University connected it to OpenAI's GPT-3.5 to build an open-domain conversational system.

== Applications ==
Furhat featured at Bucharest Tech Week 2019 and has been used as a museum guide, for concierge services, and in other public engagement contexts. Furhat has also been incorporated in healthcare trials, with applications in autism therapy and mental health assessment. Furhat has been used at:

- KTH Royal Institute of Technology (Sweden) – early work in multimodal interaction and facial animation
- TU Graz (Austria) – natural language conversation and dialogue systems
- UK National Robotarium, Heriot-Watt University (UK) – research into conversational AI and human-robot interaction, including a public demonstrations as a GPT-powered receptionist, and a conversational robot used in a housing complex for older residents
- University of Manchester (UK) – research in cognitive robotics and healthcare communication
- University of Twente (Netherlands) – studies on bias and ethnic representation in human-robot interaction
- Uppsala University - studies and research in measuring children’s wellbeing and mental health with social robots, large language models-powered social robots in cybersecurity applications, co-designing a social robot facilitator to boost community engagement with type 2 diabetes prevention, and symbolic logic framework for situational awareness in mixed autonomy.

== Named deployments ==
Several Furhat-based robots have been used in applied settings. Examples include:

- Tengai – Developed with the Swedish recruitment firm TNG, Tengai is a Furhat-based robot used in structured interview settings to reduce bias. It uses the Furhat platform but has a distinct personality and dialogue model tailored for recruitment.
- SEMMI – A multilingual travel assistant robot installed by Deutsche Bahn at German train stations. It engages with travelers in multiple languages and provides transportation services and travel advice.
- FRAnny – A localized version of SEMMI deployed at Frankfurt Airport. FRAnny provides personalized assistance and acts as concierge.
- PETRA – A conversational health-screening robot developed by Furhat Robotics, the Merck Group, and the design agency Prototyp. PETRA conducts pre-screening interactions with users to detect signs of diseases such as psoriasis and depression.
- Basil – A robotic barista employed in an old-age home to study human-robot interaction with older adults.
- BRILLO – A robotic architecture developed by researchers at the University of Naples that uses the Furhat head in combination with other robotic elements for bar-tending.

== Reception ==
Jamie Rigg of Engadget discussed whether people could come to accept a robot of this kind. A 2022 study examined how older adults perceived the robot.

== In popular culture ==
Researchers at KTH used Furhat in a 2019 study on learning non-verbal behaviour for a social robot from YouTube videos.

Furhat was the central character of Arise Amazons, a theatre production by Karin Victorin staged at Orionteatern in Stockholm, in which the robot performed alongside opera singers, dancers, drag artists and horses. The production is the subject of Victorin's 2020 master's thesis at Linköping University.

In 2019 Furhat Robotics and Bandai Namco built a Furhat-based version of the Japanese virtual idol Mirai Komachi, used at amusement parks and entertainment venues in Japan.

== See also ==
- Human-robot interaction
- Humanoid robot
- Embodied agent
- Artificial intelligence in healthcare
