= Vivian Chu =

American roboticist and entrepreneur

- Born: c. 1987 (age 38–39); California
- Education: University of Pennsylvania; University of California, Berkeley; Georgia Tech
- Known for: Co-founder of Diligent Robotics, designing AI software for service robots
- Awards: 2022 Fortune 40 under 40, 2021 and 2022 Fast Company Queer 50, 2019 MIT Technology Review 35 Innovators Under 35
- Scientific career
- Fields: Robotics
- Workplaces: Diligent Robotics

Vivian Chu (born c. 1987) is an American roboticist and entrepreneur, specializing in the field of human-robot interaction. She is Chief Technology Officer at Diligent Robotics, a company she co-founded in 2017 for creating autonomous, mobile, socially intelligent robots.

== Early life and education ==
Chu was born in San Jose, California. Growing up, she lived with her parents, who were both software engineers, and her grandparents.

She received her bachelor's degree in electrical engineering and computer science from the University of California, Berkeley in 2009. During her time at Berkeley, she worked as a research assistant in the lab of Dennis K. Lieu, where she worked on integrated flywheels in triple hybrid drive trains. Upon graduation, she worked for IBM Almaden Research, an innovation lab for disruptive technology, where her research centered on natural language processing and intelligent information integration.

In 2011, Chu left IBM Almaden to pursue a master's degree at the University of Pennsylvania. At Penn, she worked under the mentorship of Katherine Kuchenbecker in the Haptics Research Group as a part of the GRASP Lab. She focused on haptic technology to enable robots to both interact with their environment and understand the abstract terms that humans would use to describe the feeling of that interaction. For example, a human may say a carpet is fuzzy, but Chu's algorithms would enable a robot to sense the rug, perform a computation, and also associate that “feeling” with the adjective or descriptor of fuzzy. Chu and her colleagues were able to train PR2 robots equipped with haptic sensors to touch objects and relate the information from the sensor with the human-provided adjective for the haptic quality of the object. The robot was able to learn these associations and then later generalize its learning to objects it had not yet touched and provide an adjective descriptor similar to one a human might use. This work were reported in Chu's first author paper in 2013, which was awarded Best Paper in Cognitive Robotics at the IEEE International Conference on Robotics.

After completing her Master's in 2013, Chu had a summer internship at Honda Research Institute and continued graduate training at Georgia Tech. She worked towards a PhD in Robotics under the mentorship of Andrea L. Thomaz in the Socially Intelligent Machines Lab and under the mentorship of Sonia Chernova in the Robot Autonomy and Interactive Learning Lab. Her work focused on building algorithms that enable robots to reason about action effects and interact with their environments in an adaptable way. Chu was inspired by a talk in developmental psychology discussing how children learn to interact with their environments. She figured that she could approach robot learning in this way as well, giving robots the basic building blocks of cognition so that they could play with objects in the environment and learn the appropriate ways to interact with them. Chu based her design on applying human-guided robot self-exploration to learn affordances. She built algorithms that enabled robots with both self guided and supervised learning of the affordances of objects in the environment, and showed that the combination of both self and supervised learning allows for the best robot performance. Chu and Thomaz filed a patent in 2017 for this technology, which is also when she completed her PhD.

== Career and research ==
In 2015, Chu spent a summer as an intern at Google[x] under the mentorship of Leila Takayama. She then began working alongside Andrea Thomaz to create a company to build socially intelligent robots that can assist people with chores at work and home. In 2017, they co-founded Diligent Robotics. After graduating from her PhD in 2018, she became the full-time Chief Technology Officer at the firm. She leads a diverse team of roboticists who build robots that feature autonomous mobile manipulation, social intelligence, and human-guided learning abilities, inspired by Chu's graduate discoveries. She has an Erdős number of 3.

=== Diligent Robotics ===
Diligent Robotics' first clinical assistant was Poli, a one-arm robot that was able to pre-fetch supply kits to allow nursing staff to spend more time with patients. Poli was piloted at Seton Medical Center at the University of Texas in Austin. The firm's second healthcare support robot, Moxi, is a refurbished and updated version of Poli. It possesses more human-like features including a face that can visually communicate social cues and a head and torso.

In 2020, Diligent Robotics raised a $10 million Series A. In 2022, the company raised more than $30 million for their Series B, led by Tiger Global, for a total of nearly $50 million since founding. It has won accolades including being named as Time's 100 Best Inventions (2019), World Economic Forum Technology Pioneer (2021), and Newsweek America's Greatest Disruptors (2021).

== Awards and honors ==
- 2013 Best paper in cognitive robotics IEEE International Conference on Robotics
- 2014 Google Anita Borg Memorial Scholarship
- 2016 Paper on Human-Guided Robot Self-Exploration nominated for Best Technical Advance in Human-Robot Interaction
- 2019 MIT Technology Review 35 Innovators Under 35
- 2021 Fast Company Queer 50
- 2022 Fast Company Queer 50
- 2022 Fortune Magazine 40 under 40

== Depiction in media ==
- 2020: The Future of Science is Female by Zara Stone

== Appearances ==
- In November 2020, Chu keynoted at ROS World on "Accelerating Innovation with ROS: Lessons in Healthcare"
- In October 2022, Chu keynoted at the IEEE/RSJ International Conference on Intelligent Robots and Systems (IROS) in Kyoto on “Launching Socially-Aware Mobile Manipulation Robots in Hospitals.”
- In July 2023, Chu presented at Fortune Brainstorm Tech in Utah on "Robotic Revolution."

== Select publications ==
- Bin Liu, Laura Chiticariu, Vivian Chu, H. V. Jagadish, and Frederick R. Reiss, "Refining Information Extraction Rules Using Data Provenance", IEEE Data Engineering Bulletin, 2010.
- Vivian Chu, Ian McMahon, Lorenzo Riano, Craig G. McDonald, Qin He, Jorge M. Perez-Tejada, Michael Arrigo, Naomi Fitter, John C. Nappo, Trevor Darrell, Katherine J. Kuchenbecker. "Using Robotic Exploratory Procedures to Learn the Meaning of Haptic Adjectives", IEEE International Conference on Robotics and Automation (ICRA), 2013.
- Vivian Chu, Kalesha Bullard, Andrea L. Thomaz, "Multimodal Real-time Contingency Detection for HRI", IEEE/RSJ International Conference on Intelligent Robots and Systems (IROS), 2014
- Vivian Chu, Ian McMahon, Lorenzo Riano, Craig G. McDonald, Qin He, Jorge M. Perez-Tejada, Michael Arrigo, Trevor Darrell, Katherine J. Kuchenbecker, "Robotic Learning of Haptic Adjectives Through Physical Interaction," Robotics and Autonomous Systems (RAS), 2015
- Vivian Chu, Tesca Fitzgerald, Andrea L. Thomaz, "Learning Object Affordances by Leveraging the Combination of Human-Guidance and Self-Exploration", IEEE/ACM International Conference on Human-Robot Interaction (HRI), 2016.
- Vivian Chu, Baris Akgun, Andrea L. Thomaz, "Learning Haptic Affordances from Demonstration and Human-Guided Exploration", IEEE Haptics Symposium (HAPTICS), 2016.
- Vivian Chu, Andrea L. Thomaz. "Analyzing Differences between Teachers when Learning Object Affordances via Guided-Exploration," International Journal of Robotics Research (IJRR), 2017.
