= Playware =

Term for educational hardware and software

Playware is hardware and software that aims at producing play and playful experiences among its users.

Examples of playware products are numerous with computer games as the most widespread and successful, but it is a fast-growing industry utilizing pervasive and ambient technology to create new kinds of play equipment and toys, which can be labelled “playware”.

The term playware was coined by Carsten Jessen, Associate Professor at the Technical University of Denmark and the Danish School of Education, Aarhus University, and Henrik Hautop Lund, a professor at the Technical University of Denmark. They first defined the term in their paper "Playware – Intelligent technology for children’s play" to describe both a new area of research and a product type.

Jessen and Lund argue that the playware is not so much the result of the appearance of digital technology as it is the result of many children (and adults) in modern society not having the necessary knowledge and skills needed to initiate games and play. Earlier generations of children inherited games and learned play skills from older peers when participating in cross-age activities, for instance on the street or in the backyard. This is not to the same extent the case today and according to Jessen and Lund this has led to the need for inspiration from playware.

Several international playware workshops and symposiums were given and held amongst leading playware and human-robot interaction researchers, such as the keynote talk on modular playware at the 18th IEEE International Symposium on Robot and Human Interactive Communication, and the Playware Summit in Copenhagen 2010, where amongst others Y. Sankai, H. Ishiguro, C. Breazeal, T. Fukuda, T. Shibata, K. Dautenhahn, P. Marti, N. Pares, L. Pagliarini, H. Hautop Lund gathered to set a new research agenda for future research and development in playware.
