= ACROSS Project =

Social robotics project in Spain

ACROSS
- Developer: Treelogic
- Type: AI tool
- License: GPL-2.0-or-later
- Website: Website

ACROSS is a Singular Strategic R&D Project led by Treelogic funded by the Spanish Ministry of Industry, Tourism and Trade activities in the field of Robotics and Cognitive Computing over an execution time-frame from 2009 to 2011. ACROSS project involves a number higher than 100 researchers from 13 Spanish entities.

== ACROSS project objectives ==
ACROSS modifies the design of social robotics, blocked in providing predefined services, going further by means of intelligent systems. These systems are able to self-reconfigure and modify their behavior autonomously through the capacity for understanding, learning and software remote access.

In order to provide an open framework for collaboration between universities, research centers and the Administration, ACROSS develops Open Source Services available to everybody.

== Three application domains ==
ACROSS works in three application domains:

- Autonomous living: robots are used as technological tools to help handicapped person into daily tasks.
- Psycho-Affective Disorders (autism): robots are used to mitigate cognitive disorders.
- Marketing: robots are used to interact with humans in a recreational approach.

== Consortium ==
- Treelogic
- Alimerka
- Bizintek
- Universitat Politécnica de Catalunya
- University of Deusto
- European Centre for Soft Computing
- Fatronik - Tecnalia
- Fundació Hospital Comarcal Sant Antoni Abat
- Fundación Pública Andaluza para la Gestión de la Investigación en Salud de Sevilla, "Virgen del Rocío" University Hospitals
- m-BOT
- Omicron Electronic
- Universidad de Extremadura - RoboLab
- Verbio Technologies

== See also ==
- List of robotics software
