= Media Lab Europe =

MIT-allied research institute in Dublin, Ireland (2000–2005)

Media Lab Europe (MLE) was a research institute in Dublin, Ireland, based on the MIT Media Lab concept. Created in 2000, it went into voluntary liquidation early in 2005. MLE was one of two such projects, the other of which, Media Lab Asia, split from MIT in 2003.

== Creation ==
MLE was created in July 2000 and was initiated by the Taoiseach Bertie Ahern. The lab received start-up funding of 35 million Euro from Irish Government, as well as sponsorship from industrial research partners (see below). It was located in a former Guinness warehouse in the historic Liberties area and was to have been a flagship project for the Irish Government's Digital Hub project, an urban renewal scheme aiming to encourage digital media companies to locate in the area. The MLE board initially included celebrity Bono from U2: in 2002, he stepped down in favour of fellow band member The Edge whose technical interests better fit the laboratory's mission and who (unlike Bono) regularly attended meetings of the board.

== Work ==
The lab focused on innovation in digital technology and human-machine interaction. MLE was said to have managed to recreate the creative play research atmosphere of the MIT Media Lab. By 2004 MLE was in full swing, and in the lab's short lifespan the researchers produced 21 refereed journal articles, 59 refereed full papers for conferences, and 62 refereed shorter papers for conferences, for a total of 142 refereed works. The facility achieved international recognition for a range of its work including EEG based mind-computer interfaces; the BumpList and Iso-phone. The latter two projects received honorary mention at the 2004 Prix Ars Electronica. Furthermore, MLE researchers regularly contributed to international research forums of the European Commission, the Association for Computing Machinery, and others concerned with advancing technologies and their constructive uses.

MLE held a highly successful international conference on New Interfaces for Musical Expression (NIME-02) in May 2002. In May 2004, in conjunction with Ireland's hosting of the EU Presidency, MLE and the Department of Education and Science assembled New Futures for Learning in the Digital Age. MLE also organised an associated international symposium Incremental Progress or Fundamental Change?, featuring Prof. Seymour Papert, to question attitudes and progress in digital learning.

=== Recognition issue ===
MIT refused to accredit any degrees coming from the lab and re-iterated this refusal in 2005 when the Irish government sought accreditation as a condition of renewed funding. Concerns had been raised by the Irish academic community as early as 2001, in the Wall Street Journal.

== Demise ==
The lab was unfortunate to have been founded just as the internet bubble collapsed and with it the corporate ability to invest in projects of this sort. Compounding difficulties, some members of the Irish university sector expressed concerns about the government money invested in the Lab, Although, in a call for proposals, the Higher Education Authority commented "The HEA is delighted at the level of collaboration (between MLE and Irish universities) which has been achieved in the short time since Media Lab Europe was established."

2004 saw increasing emphasis on the long-term financial viability of the project and it encountered funding difficulties: it did not seem likely that the lab would become self-financing with its original funding model in the near future and the Irish government appeared unwilling to provide sufficient further support. On 14 January 2005 MLE's Board announced that the lab would be put into voluntary liquidation and close. In the declaration of insolvency Ernst & Young, the liquidator, noted a surplus of €325,000.

Commenting in The Irish Times, Nicholas Negroponte, the founder of the MIT Media Lab, said that the research at MLE was "beyond [his] wildest expectations"; he was critical of European companies for their unwillingness to invest in the lab and said: "Many visitors to MLE thought the work in Dublin was more edgy than at MIT. In this regard, Ireland received what it asked for in spades. The failing was economic and the financial model was freakishly untimely."

However, it was also reported in the media (see for example Weckler 2005) that both internal and government reports commissioned when the lab first reported financial difficulties came to critical conclusions about the initial elements of the labs operations and practices. For example, it was noted that the number of patents produced by the lab up to 2004 was very small, though the account did not reflect on how long processes of research development and patent application would normally take.

In additional reports, the working environment at MediaLab Europe was described as "hell", "chaos" and "inmates running the asylum", while independent assessments of the Laboratory's operation commissioned by MLE noted significant improvements in management and operations since mid-2003. It was also reported in (Smith 2005) that the Irish government would have provided further but limited funding, if the board had agreed to governance changes. Inevitably such brief, unofficial reports cannot present the full picture of these complex negotiations, in which both parties discussed a range of possibilities but ultimately found closure of the lab to be the only mutually-agreeable option.

== Partners ==
Research partners included Allied Irish Banks, BT, Ericsson, Intel, and Orange. The lab also cooperated with several Irish universities and the Higher Education Authority.

== Related organisations ==
The Irish Government has funded a new research organisation at the same location, the National Digital Research Centre, with a more applied focus.

MLE was not the only attempt to recreate the innovative spirit of the MIT Media Lab: Media Lab Asia was founded by MIT and the Indian government in 2001, but it parted ways with MIT in 2003. Consistent with the premise of MIT's OpenCourseWare movement, it seems there may be no substitute for "being there."

== See also ==
- Media Lab Europe's social robots
