= Andrea L. Thomaz =

Robot Interaction research scientist and founder of Diligent Robotics

- Born: Andrea L. Thomaz
- Education: University of Texas (BS); MIT (ScM, PhD)
- Scientific career
- Fields: Computer science, Robotics
- Workplaces: University of Texas

Andrea L. Thomaz is a senior research scientist in the Department of Electrical and Computer Engineering at The University of Texas at Austin and Director of Socially Intelligent Machines Lab. She specializes in Human-Robot Interaction, Artificial Intelligence and Interactive Machine Learning.

== Education ==
In 1999, Thomaz earned her Bachelors of Science in Electrical and Computer Engineering from The University of Texas. She obtained her ScM and PhD in Electrical and Computer Engineering from MIT in 2002 and 2006, respectively.

== Career and research ==
In 2007, Thomaz joined the Georgia Institute of Technology as an Associate Professor of Interactive Computing. Her research aimed to computationally model mechanisms of social learning to build robots with social aspects and other intuitive machines. Additionally, During this time Thomaz began directing the Socially Intelligent Machines Lab. A Georgia Institute of Technology lab that were developing a socially intelligent robot called "Simon the Robot".

In 2016 Thomaz joined the University of Texas at Austin as a tenured Associate Professor in the Department of Electrical and Computer Engineering.

In 2016 Thomaz, along with co-founder Vivian Chu, founded Diligent Robotics. In 2016, Diligent released a social robot called Moxi that was rolled out in American hospitals. Moxi is a robot that helps nurses via performing tasks such as getting drugs for patients, delivering lab samples etc.

== Awards and recognition ==
In 2009, Thomaz's research was featured in MIT Technology Review for her work on socially adept robotics, specifically on Simon the Robot and the social cues it gives when performing tasks and communicating.

In October 2012 Thomaz was listed as Popular Science's Brilliant 10 for her work on Simon and the applications of building socially intuitive machines.

In 2015, Thomaz gave a TEDx talk on social robotics and gave a demonstration on her Simon project to highlight the research areas of the social robotics field and the struggles, aims and hopes for field.

== Publication highlights ==
- Effects of nonverbal communication on efficiency and robustness in human-robot teamwork (C Breazeal, CD Kidd, AL Thomaz, G Hoffman, M Berlin) 2005 IEEE/RSJ international conference on intelligent robots and systems.
- Teachable robots: Understanding human teaching behaviour to build more effective robot learners (AL Thomaz, C Breazeal) Artificial Intelligence 172 (6-7), 716-737
- Policy shaping: Integrating human feedback with reinforcement learning (S Griffith, K Subramanian, J Scholz, CL Isbell, AL Thomaz) Advances in neural information processing systems 26
