= Kerstin Dautenhahn =

German computer scientist

Kerstin Dautenhahn (born 1964) is a German computer scientist specializing in social robotics and human–robot interaction. She is a professor of electrical and computer engineering at the University of Waterloo, where she holds the Canada 150 Research Chair in Intelligent Robotics and directs the Social and Intelligent Robotics Research Laboratory.

Her main research areas include human–robot interaction, social robotics, assistive technology, and artificial intelligence, with an aim to further study topics such as social learning, human-robot collaboration, autobiographic memory, narrative, cooperation and coordination. In the application of these research areas, she has notably been interested in uses of companion robots to support independent living for the elderly, and in the therapy and education of children with autism.

== Education and career ==
Dautenhahn studied biology at Bielefeld University, earning a diploma there in 1990 and completing her doctorate (Dr. rer. nat.) in 1993. She was a researcher with the German Society for Mathematics and Data Processing (GMD) from 1993 to 1996, and in the Artificial Intelligence Laboratory of Vrije Universiteit Brussel, before becoming a lecturer at the University of Reading in 1997. She moved to the University of Hertfordshire in 2000, and became a full professor there in 2003. She took her present position as Canada 150 Research Chair at the University of Waterloo in 2018, where she is Director of Social and Intelligent Robotics Labortatory (SIRRL), and she remains a visiting professor at the University of Hertfordshire.

== Contributions ==
Dautenhahn is founding editor and co-editor-in-chief of the journal Interaction Studies: Social Behaviour and Communication in Biological and Artificial Systems.

She is also an editorial board member of Adaptive Behavior, Sage Publications; Associate Editor of the International Journal of Social Robotics; associate editor of IEEE Transactions on Cognitive and Developmental Systems; associate editor of IEEE Transactions on Affective Computing, as well as editor of the book series Advances in Interaction Studies.

She is also the editor of multiple edited volumes including Human Cognition and Social Agent Technology (1999), Socially Intelligent Agents: Creating Relationships with Computers and Robots (with Alan H. Bond, Lola Cañamero, and Bruce Edmonds, 2002), Imitation in Animals and Artifacts (with Chrystopher L. Nehaniv, 2002), and New Frontiers in Human Robot Interaction (with Joe Saunders, 2011).

She is on the advisory board of the journal AI and Society (Springer), ACM, SSAISB, and the German organisations GI and GK, as well as a lifelong fellow of AISB, executive board member of the International Foundation for Responsible Robotics. Since 2006 she has also been a member of the Standing Steering Committee of the IEEE conference RO-MAN (Human and Robot Interactive Communication).

== Recognition ==
Dautenhahn was elected as an IEEE Fellow in 2019 "for contributions to social robotics and human-robot interaction".
