= Furhat Robotics =

Swedish social robotics company

- Type: Private
- Industry: Robotics, artificial intelligence
- Founded: 2014
- Founder: Samer Al Moubayed
- Products: Furhat robot, Misty II, FurhatAI, Tengai
- Website: furhatrobotics.com mistyrobotics.com

Furhat Robotics is a Swedish social robotics company that developed as a spin-off from the KTH Royal Institute of Technology in Stockholm. It produces Furhat, a table-top humanoid social robot, and Misty II, a social robot used in healthcare and education. Its platforms have been used in academic research in cognitive science, psychology, human-computer interaction, and embodied AI, as well as in customer service, education, and healthcare.

== History ==
Furhat Robotics was founded in 2014 by Samer Al Moubayed, Preben Wik, Jonas Beskow, and Gabriel Skantze, most of whom were affiliated with the Royal Institute of Technology (KTH) in Stockholm. The company was created out of Al Moubayed's doctoral research in speech technology and artificial intelligence at KTH. He had previously studied computer science in Damascus, focusing on emotional speech synthesis, and completed a master's degree in speech and language technology in Belgium.

While developing a social robot prototype, Al Moubayed posted a video of the robot online and was contacted by Disney's R&D team, and he travelled to Pittsburgh in 2014 to collaborate on development. He founded Furhat Robotics in Stockholm later that year with support from KTH and Disney collaborators.

By 2017, the company had 13 employees and reported 50 customers, including Disney, Intel, Honda, Merck, KPMG, and Deutsche Telekom. In September 2017, it received $2.5 million in seed funding from venture capital firms Balderton Capital and LocalGlobe. In 2019, the company worked with Swedish recruitment firm TNG to develop Tengai, a robot designed to standardize interview processes.

In January 2022, Furhat Robotics acquired the U.S.-based Misty Robotics, and incorporated it's mobile platform into Furhat's offerings. incorporating its product line and technologies and adding a mobile robot platform to Furhat's stationary robots. The acquisition also allowed Furhat to market its products in the education and healthcare domains.

As of 2025, the company's robotic platforms have been used by university research teams and companies in Sweden, the United Kingdom, Europe, Japan, and the Middle East.

== Products ==
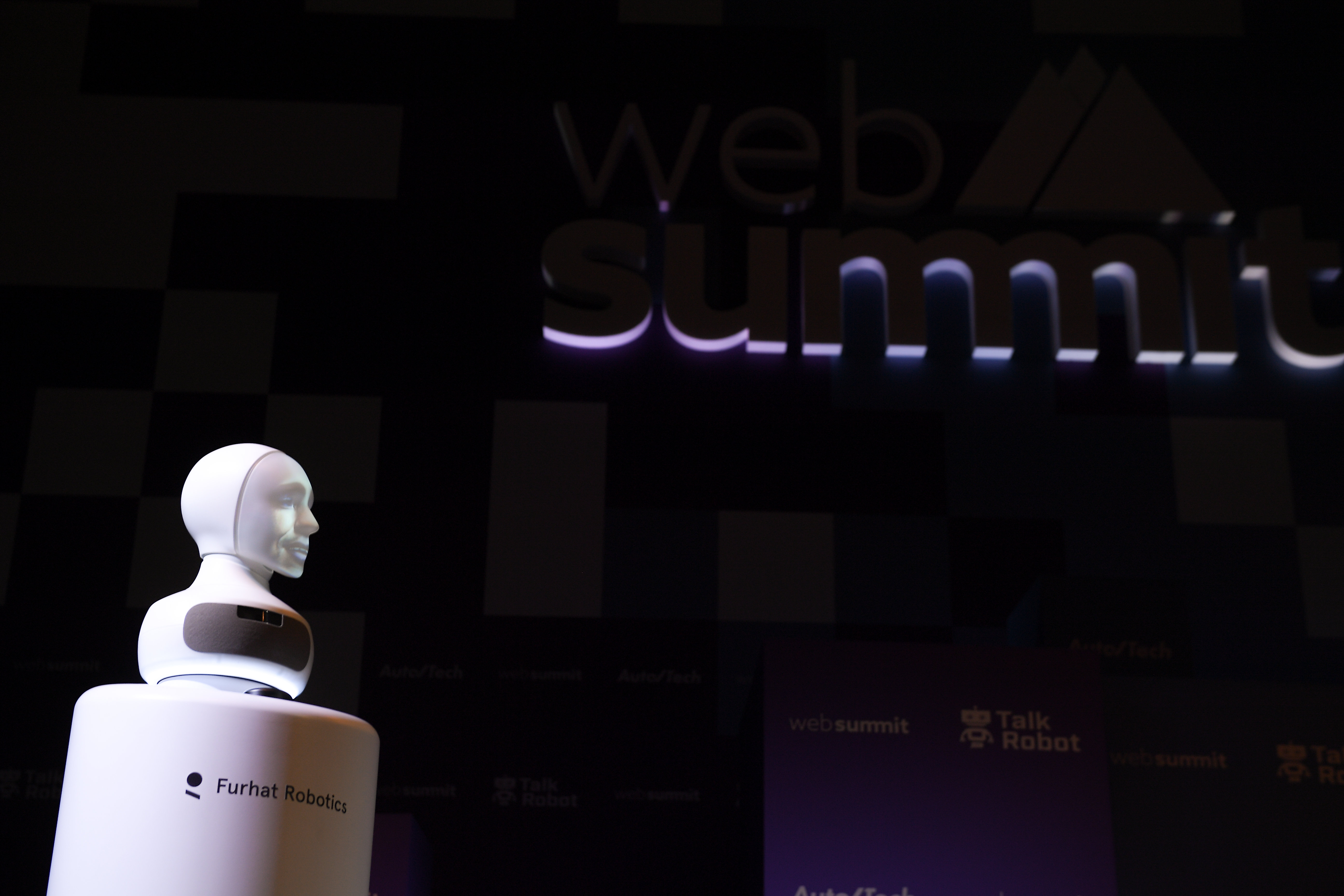

Furhat is a humanoid bust with a back-projected face capable of displaying various virtual characters. It supports interaction through voice, facial expressions, eye contact, and head movement.

Misty is a programmable social robot originally developed by U.S.-based startup Misty Robotics, spun out of Sphero in 2018. The Misty II platform, used in education, research, and front-desk assistant roles, has a mobile base, built-in sensors, and a customizable personality.

== Business model ==
The company operates a platform-based business in which third-party developers build applications for its social robot interfaces. Revenue comes from B2B hardware sales, mainly to universities and research teams, software development kit (SDK) licenses, and enterprise partnerships. A 2021 study of social robotics in manufacturing identified Furhat as one of a small number of companies piloting human-interaction robots in commercial settings.

The platform combines a robotic head with a back-projected face with an SDK and conversational operating system. Developers can use Kotlin-based scripting, Python APIs, or graphical, no-code tools. It also integrates third-party text-to-speech and automatic speech recognition systems, voice cloning, and large language models.

Tengai, a recruitment robot developed with the Swedish hiring firm TNG, was built on Furhat's hardware and operating system with its own dialogue model for structured job interviews. It was spun off in 2019 into Tengai AB, which continues to license Furhat's technology. The consultancy Rohrbeck Heger cited Furhat as an example of a startup building a developer ecosystem around a platform-based business model.

== Awards and recognition ==
In 2019, Furhat Robotics was selected as a finalist in the Robotics and Hardware category at the SXSW Interactive Innovation Awards.

Furhat Robotics was among ten recipients of the Netexplo Innovation Award, presented during the Netexplo Forum at UNESCO Headquarters in Paris.
