= Media Lab Europe's social robots =

Joe Robot and Anthropos were social robots at Media Lab Europe. They were developed to aid in research on anthropomorphism and to explore the illusion of life and intelligence during the development of a meaningful social interaction between artificial systems and people. As artificial systems enter our social space, we will inherently project/impose our interpretation on their actions similar to the techniques we employ in rationalising, for example, a pet's behaviour. This propensity to anthropomorphise should not be seen as a hindrance to social system development, but rather a useful mechanism that requires judicious examination and employment in social system research. A fundamental balance between function and form for human-robot interaction is necessary.
