= Paro (robot) =

Therapeutic robot

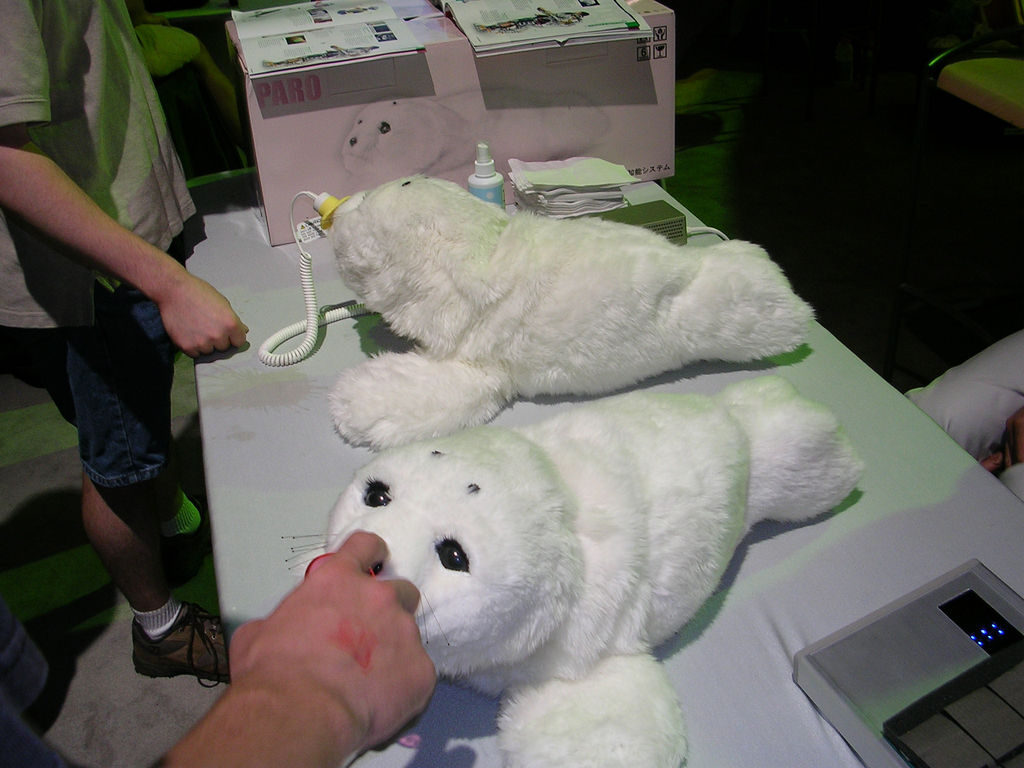
Paro seal robot

PARO is a therapeutic baby harp seal robot, intended to be very cute and to have a calming effect on and elicit emotional responses in patients of hospitals and nursing homes, similar to animal-assisted therapy except using robots.

== History ==
Paro was designed by Takanori Shibata of the Intelligent System Research Institute of Japan's AIST beginning in 1993. It was first exhibited to the public in late 2001, costing US$15 million to develop, and became a "Best of COMDEX" finalist in 2003, and handmade versions have been sold commercially by Shibata's company Intelligent System Co. since 2004. Paro is based on harp seals Shibata saw in an ice field in northeastern Canada, where he also recorded their cries in order to use them for Paro's simulated cries. Paro was classified as a Class 2 medical device by U.S. regulators in fall 2009.

Paro has been used primarily in care facilities, especially as a form of therapy for dementia patients. After a study was conducted to see the effects of robots on children with autism spectrum disorder, it appeared that there are numerous benefits. The robots were able to analyze the specifics of the disorder and then intervened by creating controlled environments that assisted in reducing the anxiety that can result from the disorder (2016). This also benefits children as the robots are social companions for those interacting with it. The study found that as a result of the robots, “encouraging effects such as increased engagement, increased levels of attention and novel social behaviours, for example joint attention and imitation were found, when the children interact with robots” (Huijnen, 2016, p. 2010). The robots had roles of a playmate, social actor, therapist and contained the ability to behave as humans (2016).

According to a study based on a 2014 census in Brazil, 195 of 250 older people living in retirement homes chose the Paro robot for nurses. A 2016 study of 130 older citizens living in Slovakian retirement homes indicated that 70 of them chose companion bots as well, according to research done by a group of mechatronic experts. It was feasible to detect agitation tendencies and intervene before patients got aggressive using Paro by modulating their sensory stimulations. Experiments at a Japanese nursing home show that dementia patients who interacted with Paro calmed down in the majority of cases without the usage of drugs. Because the robot does not need to be cared for like a pet and may be used by individuals who are sensitive to hair, it has proven to be a more practical and helpful alternative to guide dogs. The robot is capable to help monitor energy consumption.

== Description ==
Paro is outfitted with dual 32-bit processors, three microphones, twelve tactile sensors covering its fur, touch-sensitive whiskers, and a delicate system of motors and actuators that silently move its limbs and body. The robot responds to petting by moving its tail and opening and closing its eyes. Shibata designed it to actively seek out eye contact, respond to touch, cuddle with people, remember faces, and learn actions that generate a favorable reaction. He argues,

Just like animals used in pet therapy, Paro can help relieve depression and anxiety—but it never needs to be fed and doesn’t die.

Paro also responds to sounds and can learn names, including its own. It produces sounds similar to a real baby seal and, unlike a real baby seal, is programmed to be active during the day and to sleep at night. The robot comes in white but also gold, pink and gray.

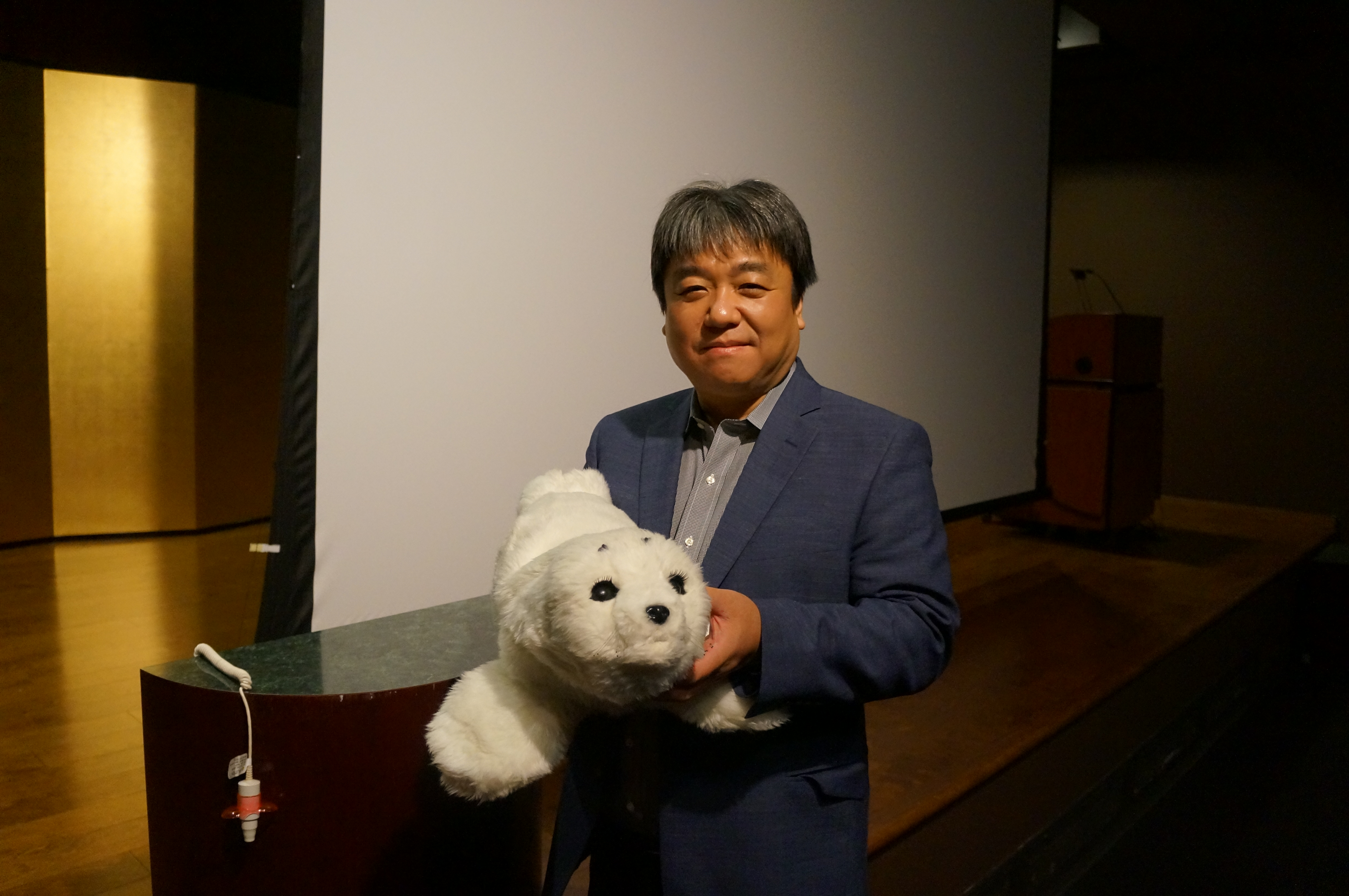
On June 7, 2018, Dr Takanori Shibata holding his creation PARO, a robot therapy device.

== Ethical concerns ==
Dr. Bill Thomas, founder of the Green House Project which aims to replace long-term care at nursing homes with small, home-like environments where people can live full and interactive lives, raised concerns over whether it was humane to entrust the task of emotional support for human beings to robots. Dr. Sherry Turkle, the director of MIT's Initiative on Technology and the Self, argued that robots like Paro provide an illusion of a relationship, and those who find human relationships challenging may turn to robots for companionship instead.

== In popular culture ==
In The Simpsons episode "Replaceable You", Bart Simpson and Martin Prince created robotic baby seals which they named "Robopets". These were essentially Paro robots which were designed to make the old people in Springfield Retirement Castle happier.

Paro is featured in "Old People," the eighth episode of the first season of Aziz Ansari's Netflix show, Master of None.

== See also ==
- Robotic pet
