= Pleo =

Animatronic pet dinosaur toy

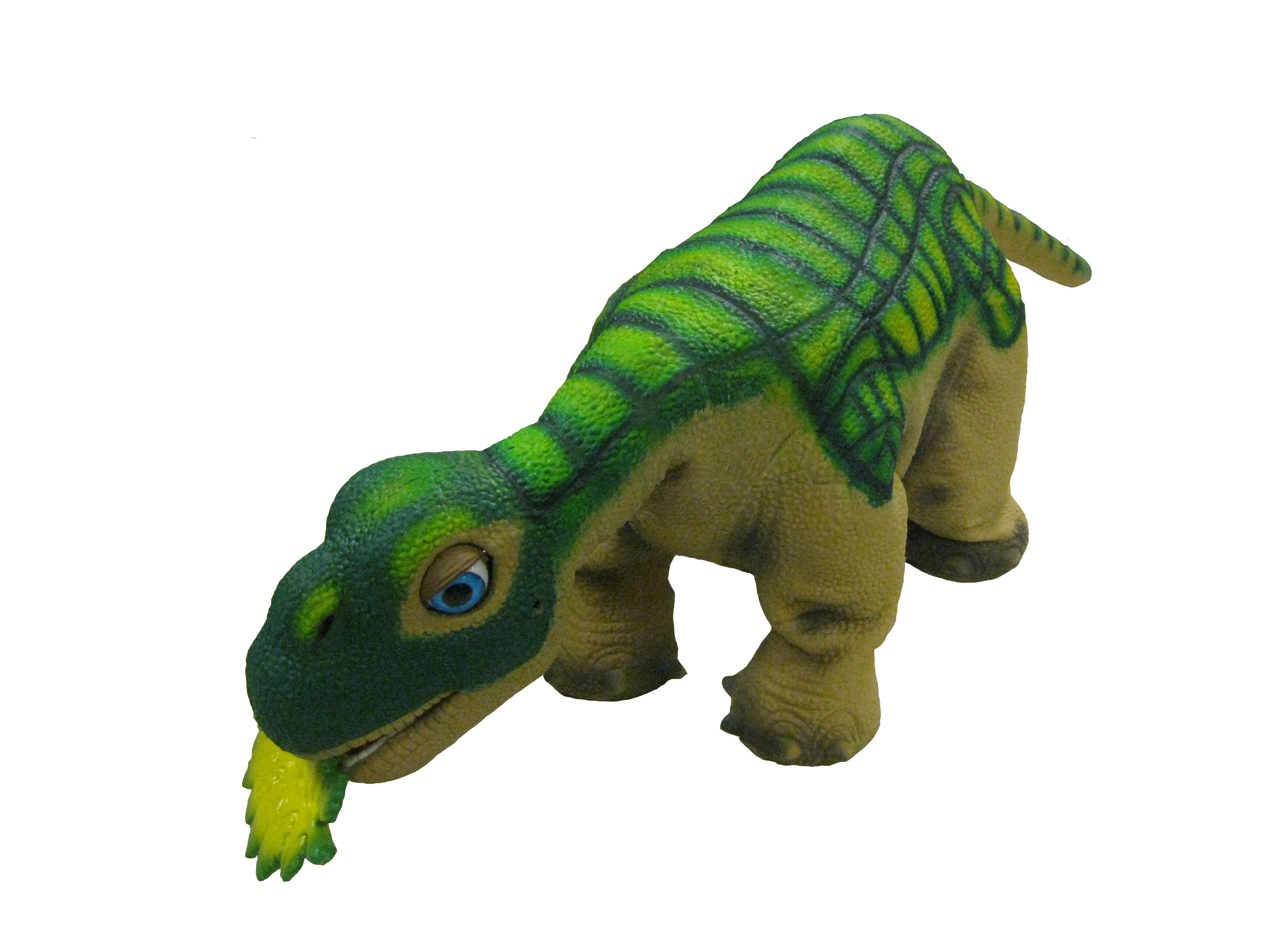
Pleo Robot

PLEO is an animatronic pet dinosaur toy manufactured by Innvo Labs, a company located in both Hong Kong and Nevada. The toy has the appearance and (imagined) behavior of a week-old baby Camarasaurus dinosaur. It was designed by Caleb Chung, the co-creator of the Furby, Chung's company Ugobe first sold Pleo and was manufactured by Jetta Company Limited. The species of dinosaur chosen allows for concealing the sensors and motors needed for the animation, since it has a big body shape and relatively large head. According to their website, each Pleo would "learn" from its experiences and environment through artificial intelligence and develop an individual personality.

PLEO was unveiled on February 7, 2006, at the DEMO Conference in Scottsdale, Arizona, and was expected to come on the Indian and American markets around Fall 2007. PLEO shipments started on December 5, 2007.

In April 2009, Ugobe laid off all of its employees and filed for bankruptcy.

On June 8, 2009, the original PLEO manufacturer Jetta announced it is re-launching Pleo and are continuing the line including accessories such as the vital battery and battery charger components. Since 14 July 2009, PLEO is owned by Innvo Labs Corporations (a division of Jetta).

In December 2011, the second generation, PLEO rb, was first launched in America, Europe and Hong Kong where Innvo Labs headquarters are located.

On July 10, 2017, the NPR "Hidden Brain" interviewer Shankar Vedantam used a Pleo robot on the stage of the "Aspen Ideas Festival" to illustrate some issues of "robot ethics" while interviewing Kate Darling of MIT's Media Lab.
