= Entertainment robot =

Robot designed to entertain

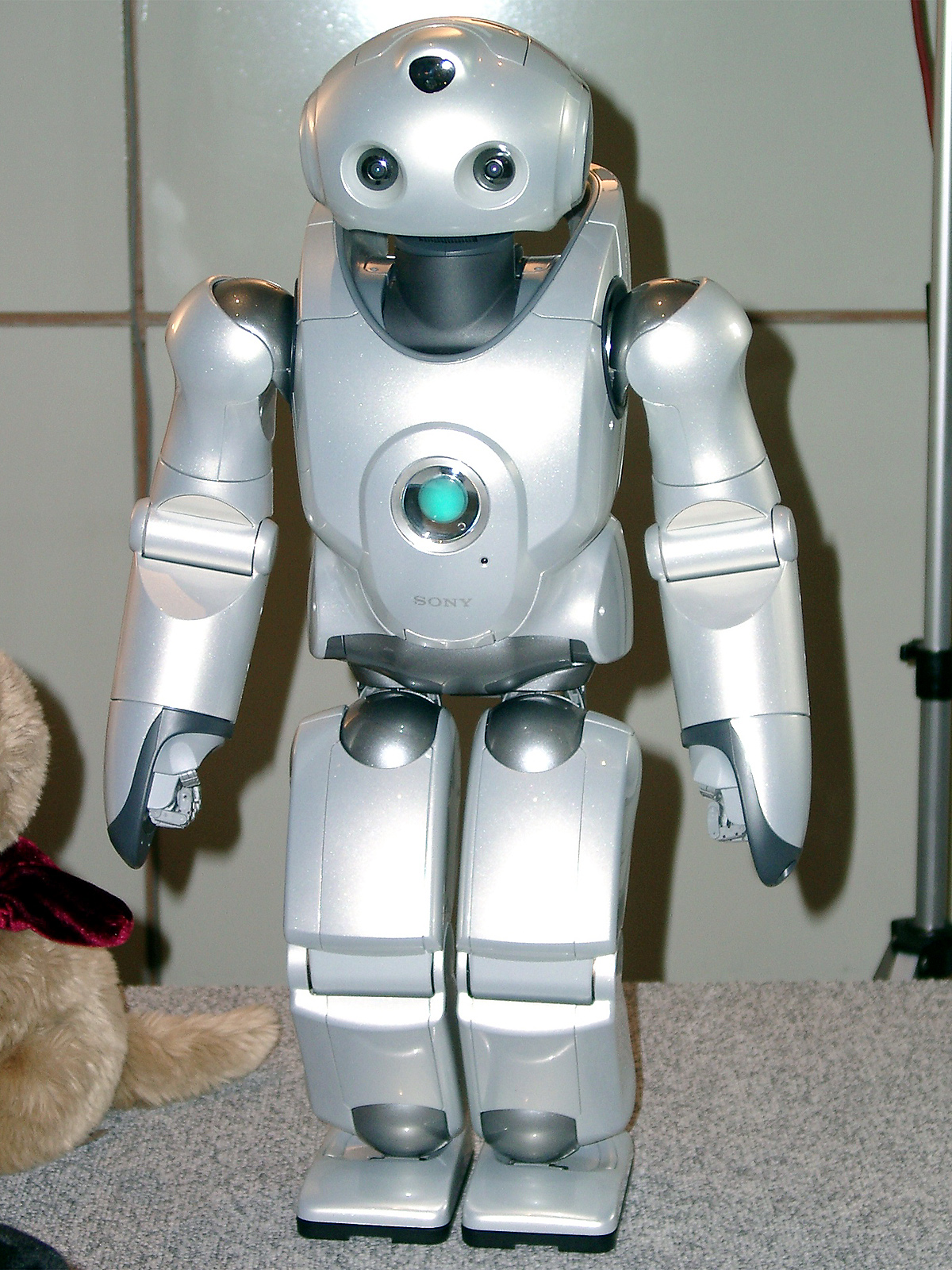
The Sony Qrio robot from 2003, marketed under the slogan "Makes life fun, makes you happy!"

An entertainment robot is a robot that is not made for utilitarian use, as in production or domestic services, but for the sole subjective pleasure of the human. It serves, usually the owner or his housemates, guests, or clients. Robotic technologies are applied in many areas of culture and entertainment.

Expensive robotics are applied to the creation of narrative environments in commercial venues where servo motors, pneumatics, and hydraulic actuators are used to create movement with often preprogrammed responsive behaviors such as in Disneyland's haunted house ride.

Entertainment robots can also be seen in the context of media arts where artists have been employing advanced technologies to create environments and artistic expression also utilizing actuators and sensors to allow their robots to react and change about viewers.

== Toy robot ==
Relatively cheap, mass-produced entertainment robots are used as mechanical, sometimes interactive, toys that perform various tasks and tricks on command. The first commercial hit was modeled on the canine.

=== Robotic dog ===
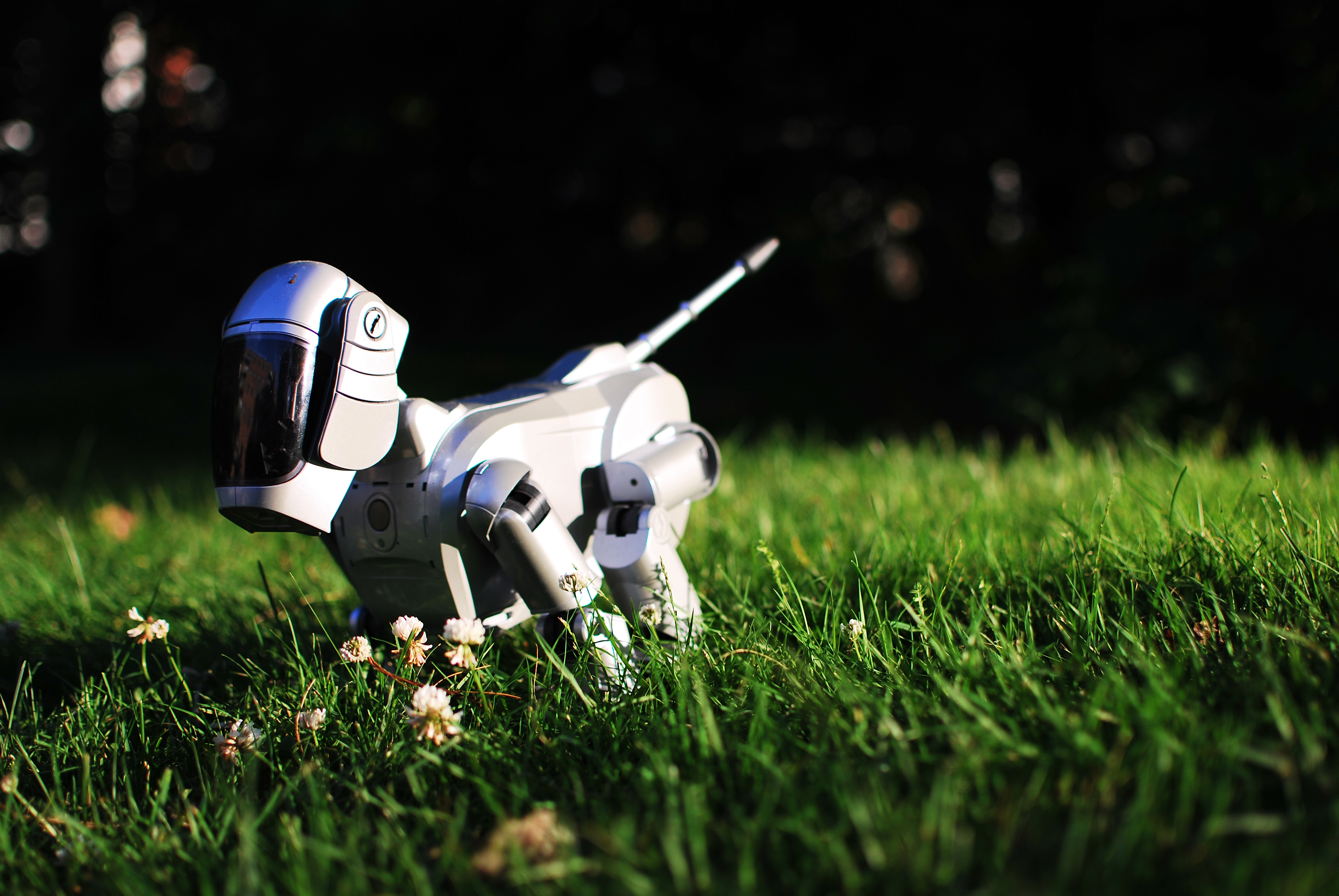
An AIBO ERS-111, from 2010

Robot dogs as a fad have been produced with relatively little variation. These are some commercial models:

- Teksta, a toy robot dog popular in the 1990s was intended to be able to perform card tricks and respond to commands.
- Aibo (robot dog manufactured by Sony)
- Poo-Chi
- I-Cybie
- iDog (Sega's robot iPod music speaker)
- Gupi, a robotic guinea pig
- Space Dog, the remote control dog

Robot dogs also appear fairly frequently in fiction compared to other forms of personal entertainment robots.

- K-9, The Doctor's portable computer and robot, from the British BBC Television series Doctor Who.
- Preston, Wendolene's robot dog from the 1995 animated Wallace and Gromit film A Close Shave.
- Goddard, pet of Jimmy Neutron.

=== Robotic cat ===
Although less common than their canine counterparts, there are robotic cats on the commercial market. Examples include:

- Joy for All Companion Pet Cat
- MarsCat
- metaCat
- Nicoo
- Perfect Petzzz Kitten
- Petoi Nybble Q

Examples in fiction include Buzz Lightyear's Sox, Mechano from the Tom and Jerry cartoon "Push Button Kitty," and the titular robot of Starikov's "The Cybercat."

=== Humanoid entertainment robots ===
Despite those humanoid robots for utilitarian uses, some humanoid robots aim at entertainment uses, such as Sony's QRIO and Wow Wee's RoboSapien. They are usually capable of some advanced features like Voice Recognition or Walking.

== Commercial show robots ==
For machines for the entertainment industry, cost is not the driving factor in design choices, and so the robots are often at a price point outside of what a private person would choose to pay

These robots are made for use as:

- shop-front - created by a manufacturer to show what they are technologically capable of and so promote their other products.
- prop - inanimate performer or even artificial actor in show, TV, and movie production (as the fictitious first toy robots, see above); as technology advances, some advanced robots can, often helped with other special effects, to make them seem what cannot (yet), even be significantly more than a cast extra, such as the droids R2-D2 and C-3PO in the Star Wars double trilogy (1977-2005) which have proved rather popular from the start.
- promotions - Used at trade shows where they move about a trade show floor providing tongue-in-cheek interaction with trade show attendees to bring said attendees to a particular company's trade show booth.
- exhibit - Robots such as Robothespian are used at venues such as science museums to explain concepts or just be an interactive exhibit in their own right

== Non-commercial art robots ==
In 1956, Nicolas Schöffer created Cysp 1 (Spatiodynamique Cybernétique), a robot and dancer working together to create an abstract sculpture and choreography with concrete music by Pierre Henry. These works could react to color, sound, and light.

Survival Research Laboratories, in San Francisco, California, creates large destructive robotic performances to roast contemporary culture and express their distaste for the military-industrial complex.

Emergent Systems is creating large-scale interactive art environments where robots can respond to humans and each other as they react and evolve in robotic installations. Autopoiesis was one such artificial life work that allowed a series of robots constructed of grapevines to both act as individuals and a group. Augmented Fish Reality allowed Siamese fighting fish to control their robots to meet across the gap of their glass fish bowls.

Intel Museum hosts the A.I.-driven interactive robot, ARTI, which is short for "artificial intelligence". This robot is considered to be a work of fine art and is capable of recognizing faces, understands speech, and even teaches the museum guests about the history of the museum and its founders, Robert Noyes and Gordon Moore. ARTI's face is made out of an inanimate silicon wafer.

== See also ==
- Digital pet
- Domestic robot
- Humanoid robot
- List of robotic dogs
