= List of robotic dogs =

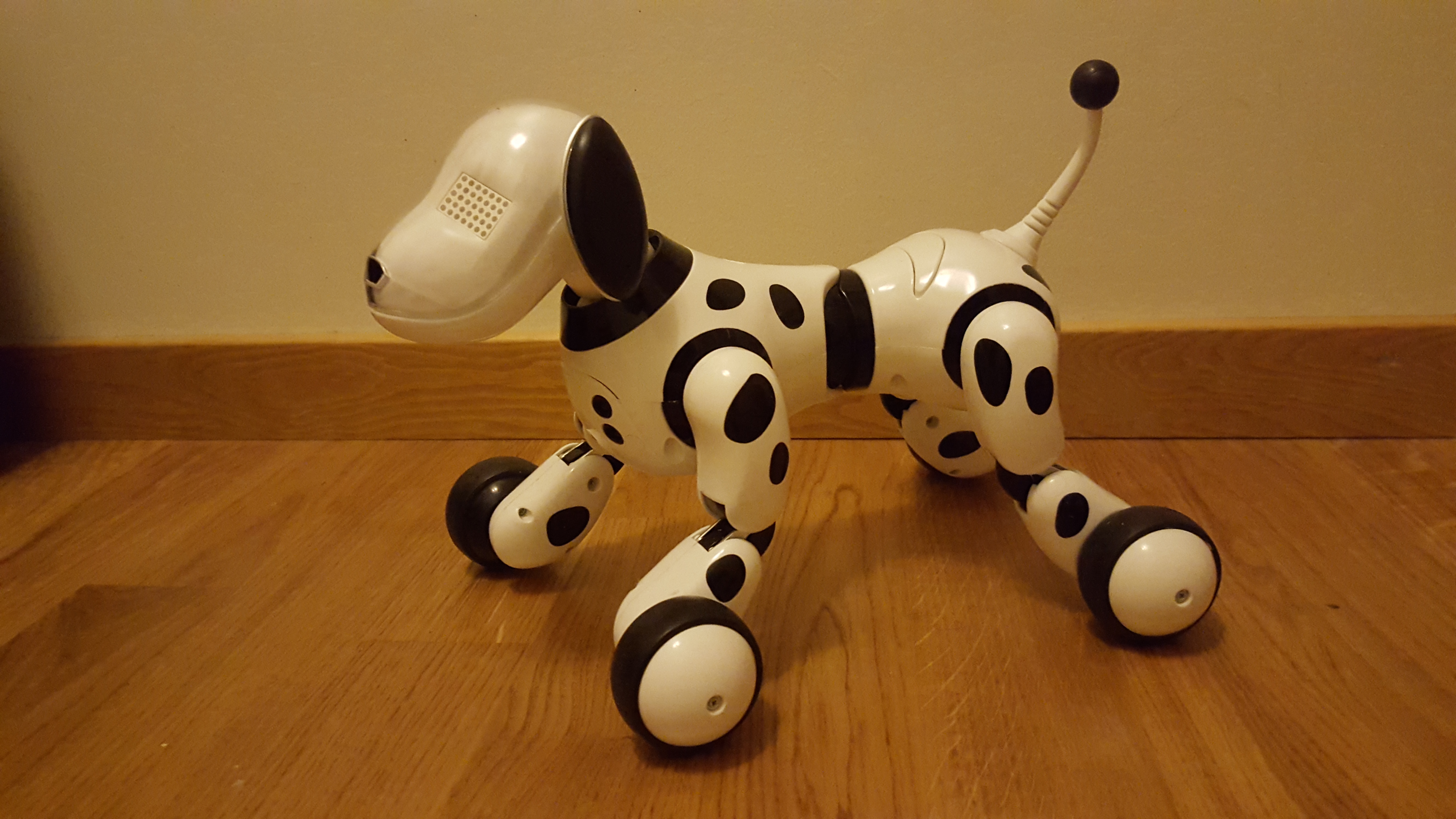
Spinmaster's robotic dog Zoomer

Robotic dogs are quadrupedal robots designed to resemble dogs in appearance and behaviour. As of 2024, various military applications have been seen.

== Commercial and research ==
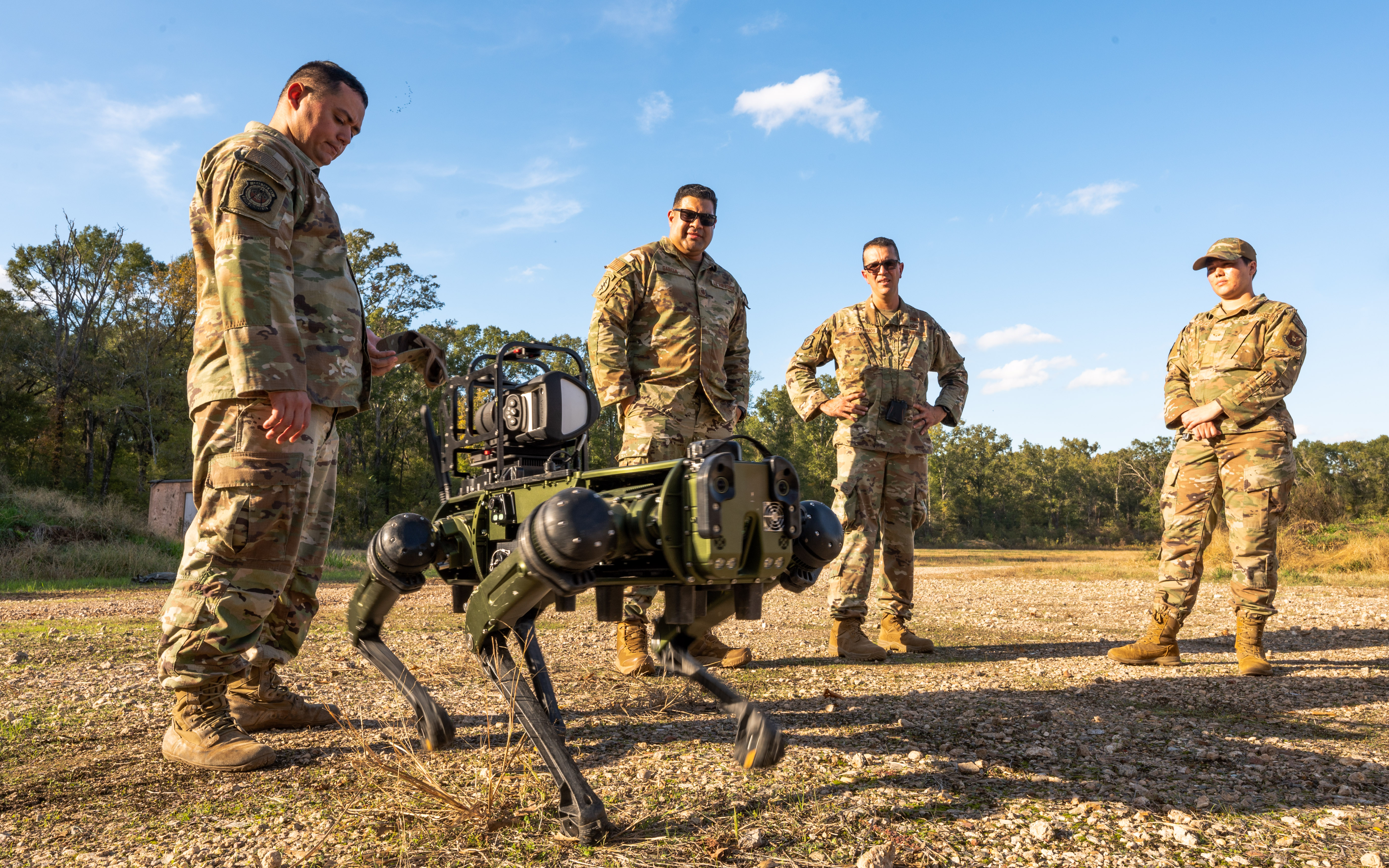
2nd Civil Engineer Squadron members with a Ghost Robotics robot dog at Barksdale Air Force Base in 2023

=== Quadruped ===
==== Boston Dynamics ====
- BigDog, quadruped robot created by Boston Dynamics with funding from the Defense Advanced Research Projects Agency that is capable of traversing varied terrain and maintaining its balance on ice and snow.
- LittleDog, another Boston Dynamics robot that is much smaller than the original BigDog project.
- Spot

==== Unitree ====
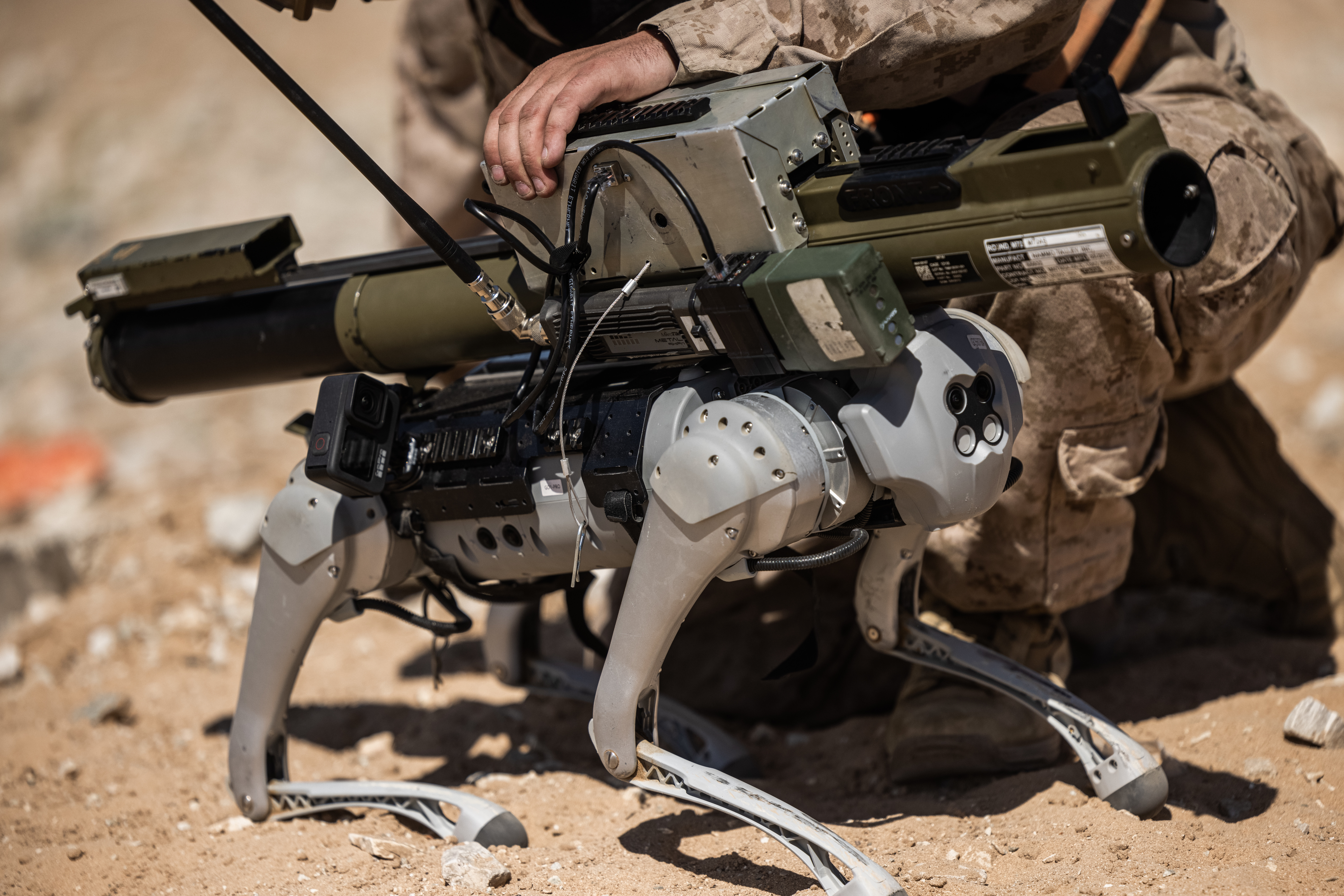
U.S. Marines test fire the M72 LAW mounted on a Unitree Go1 dog robot.

- Unitree B1, industrial quadruped robot with modified versions developed for firefighting applications.
- Unitree B2, industrial quadruped robot designed for industrial inspection applications.
- Unitree B2-W, wheel-legged variant of the Unitree B2 industrial quadruped robot designed for high-mobility applications including inspection and potential search and rescue support.
- Unitree As2-W, wheel-legged quadruped robot designed for industrial and outdoor applications.

==== ANYbotics ====
- ANYmal – inspection robot by Swiss firm ANYbotics.

==== DEEP Robotics ====
- X30.

==== Ghost Robotics ====
- V60, or Quadruped Uncrewed Ground Vehicle (QUGV).

==== Massachusetts Institute of Technology ====
- Cheetah, a 2015 MIT creation.

==== U.S. Army Research Laboratory / University of Pennsylvania ====
- Canid, quadruped with a flexible spine created by the U.S. Army Research Laboratory and UPenn.

==== Istituto Italiano di Tecnologia ====
- HyQ, hydraulic quadruped robot able to run up to 2 m/s, developed by the Advanced Robotics Department of the IIT (Istituto Italiano di Tecnologia).

==== Florida A&M University ====
- SCARAB, climbing and walking quadruped robot developed by the Florida A&M University.

==== Robot Alliance ====
- Product which was combat-tested in Donetsk in August 2024.

==== Unidentified company ====
- Anonymous firm's technology demonstration on EP05 of 2024 Britain's Got Talent.

=== Hexapedal ===
- Rise, hexaped.
- Rhex, hexaped robot.

== Consumer ==
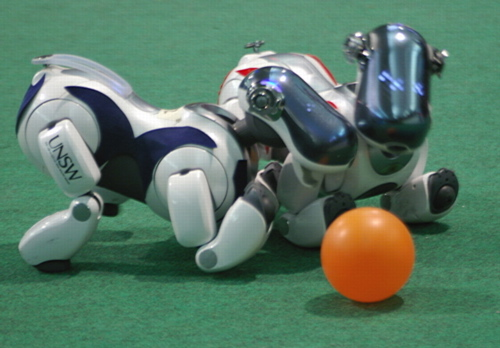
Sony's AIBO

- AIBO (Sony), stylized as aibo.
- Big Scratch & Lil' Scratch (Trendmasters)
- Bow-wow
- CHiP (WowWee)
- F.I.D.O.
- Gaylord (Ideal Toy Company), robotic dog controllable by leash, produced in the 1960s
- Genibo, robotic dog produced by the Korean company Dasatech.
- I-Cybie (Silverlit Electronics)
- iDog (Sega) and (Tiger Electronics)
- iDog amp'd (Sega) and (Tiger Electronics)
- iDog Clip (Sega) and (Tiger Electronics)
- iDog Dance (Sega) and (Tiger Electronics)
- iDog soft speaker (Sega) and (Tiger Electronics)
- Lucky the Incredible Wonder Pup (Zizzle)
- Mio Pup (Tiger Electronics) An "emoto-tronic" robot pet with over 100 "eye-cons" to show its feelings
- Poo-Chi (Sega) and (Tiger Electronics)
- Robopet (WowWee)
- Rocket the Wonder Dog (Fisher-Price)
- Smartpet, robot dog that uses an iPhone to be powered
- Space Dog (Yoshiya, Wyandotte, and Schyling), aka. "Robo" or "Rover the Space Dog"
- Spotbot, robotic dog from (Tomy)’s Omnibot family
- Squeakee the Balloon Dog (Moose Toys)
- Tekno the Robotic Puppy, also called "Teksta Interactive Robotic Puppy" appeared on the cover of Time magazine
- Unitree Robotics, available in six different types: Go2, Go1, A1, BenBen, Aliengo and B1
- Wappy Dog
- Wrex the Dawg, robot dog by WowWee
- Zoomer & Friends
- Mi CyberDog from (Xiaomi)
- Mi CyberDog II
- Jennie, a robotic companion animal designed to be a viable option to a real dog for dementia patients made by Tombot.

Joinmax Digital Robot Dog JM-DOG-001], offered as a semi-assembled kit (no soldering required) at $331, it offers a 15 servo-based impressive freedom of motion. Control is possible through a serial connection to the included controller board, or through simple commands sequences stored in memory.

- Flip over dogs – there are many examples of many flip-over dogs designed to look like robots, such as F.I.D.O and Sparky.

== Dupes ==
- “Smart Dog”, also known as “I Robot” available in three different types i.e. DuoDuo, Lele, QiQi, AIBO knockoffs by Amwell
- Build Your Own Robo Pup An ERS-7 AIBO bootleg
- “T-Dog” , a ERS-11X knockoff made by an unknown company and sold by lots of companies like Tomy or Talentoy

== In fiction ==
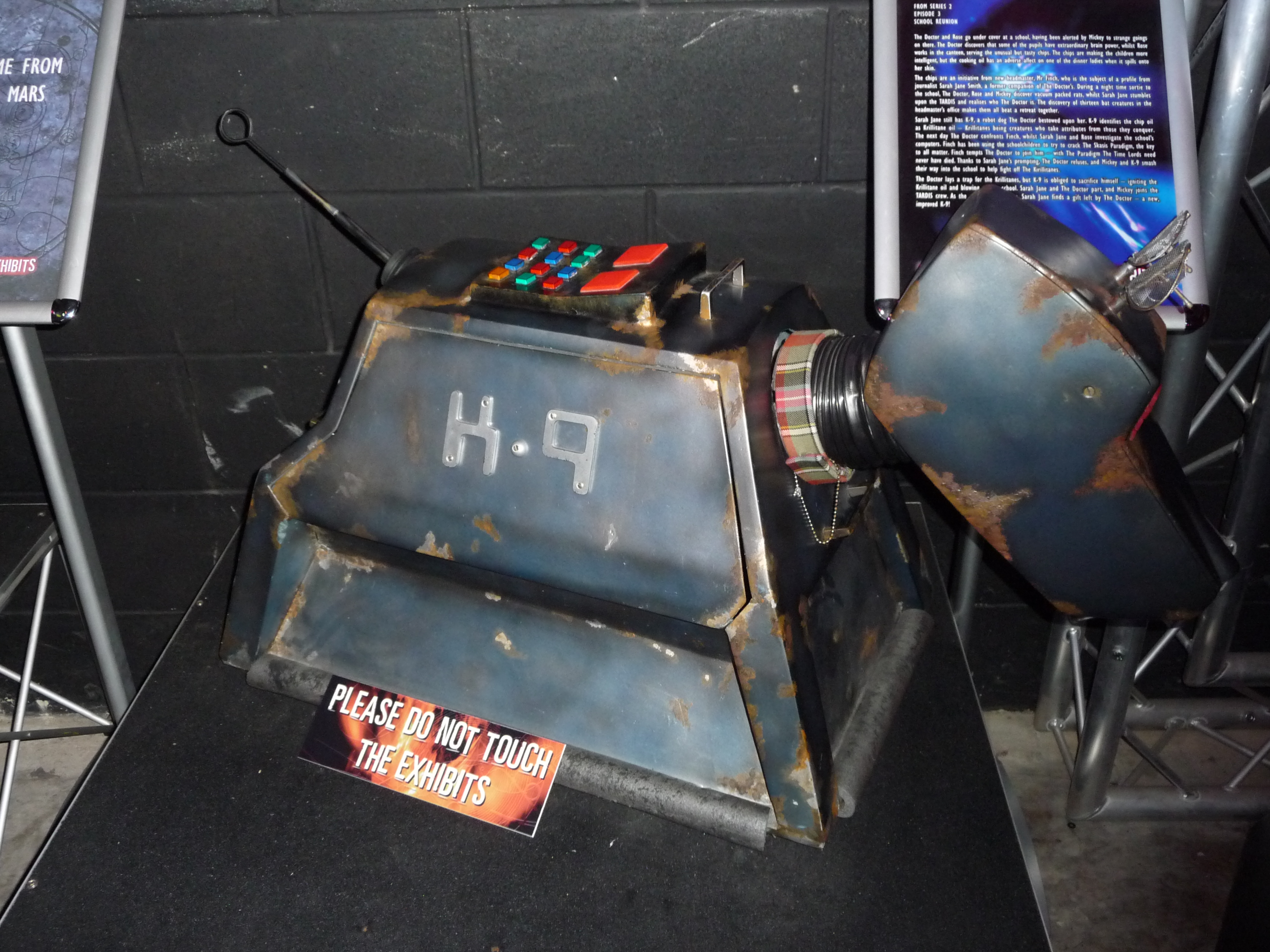
K9 (Doctor Who)

- AMEE (Autonomous Mapping Evaluation and Evasion) a military scouting robot with dog like characteristics in the 2000 film Red Planet
- A.R.F, a robotic dog from Puppy Dog Pals
- A.X.L., a robotic dog from the film of the same name.
- Bhakti, Vanille's pet robot from Final Fantasy XIII
- Bolts, from Alexander Key's 1966 book, small dog whose head was so small the electronic brain needed to be trimmed.
- C.H.O.M.P.S. (Canine Home Protection System) in the eponymous film from 1979.
- Cyber Mastiffs, used by the Adeptus Aribites in Warhammer 40,000
- Dog, Alyx's robotic pet, has several canine characteristics and was featured in the video games Half-Life 2, Half-Life 2: Episode One, and Half-Life 2: Episode Two.
- Dogbot, robot dog from the Ford Fiesta commercials
- Dynomutt, Blue Falcon's robotic dog from the animated Hanna-Barbera television show.
- E-cyboPooch, briefly Professor Dr. Cinnamon J. Scudsworth's robot dog assistant in the 2002 animated show, Clone High. E-cybopooch ultimately reveals himself to be a double agent and is destroyed when Mr. Butlertron, Scudsworth's displaced former assistant, deflects a laser meant for Scudsworth with a pie.
- EMMI (Extraterrestrial Multiform Mobile Identifier), a large doglike robot from Metroid Dread
- Fix-it, a dog-like robot from the Disney Junior show Handy Manny.
- Fright Hound from Scooby-Doo! Mystery Incorporated, a robotic Great Dane resembling Scooby-Doo
- GIR, crazy alien robot who disguised himself as a green dog in the show Invader Zim.
- Goddard, from the Jimmy Neutron movie and TV series.
- K9, the Doctor's portable computer and robot, from the British BBC Television series Doctor Who, as well as the spin-offs K-9 and Company, The Sarah Jane Adventures and K-9.
- Muffit II, Daggit from Battlestar Galactica.
- Preston, Wendolene's robot dog from the 1995 animated Wallace and Gromit film A Close Shave. Both K-9 and Preston were created by Bob Baker.
- Rags, Miles Monroe's pet in the Woody Allen movie Sleeper, who speaks (and woofs) with a human voice.
- Rat Thing, from Neal Stephenson's Snow Crash
- RIC [Robotic Interactive Canine], Power Rangers sidekick / weapon in Power Rangers Space Patrol Delta.
- Rex, from Roborex
- Robutt, from Isaac Asimov's short story "A Boy's Best Friend."
- Robo-Dog from PAW Patrol
- Robo Dog from Looney Tunes: Back in Action, a large robotic dog created by the ACME Corporation
- Rover, Lunar Jim's Robot dog in the children's animation series of the same name.
- Rudy from Trick or Treat Scooby-Doo!, a ghostly robotic dog resembling Scooby-Doo
- Runner, a rather large robot in the shape of a dog, pet and loyal friend of Grubb, from the PC role-playing video game Septerra Core.
- Rush and Treble from the Mega Man classic series
- Rusty, from the 1960s Swift comic strip "The Phantom Patrol".
- Serendipity Dog, from the 1960s/70s BBC science-themed children's television series Tom Tom.
- Slamhounds, robotic assassins in the novel Count Zero by William Gibson
- Sparkplug, Sari's robot dog, like Hasbro's toys in Transformers: Animated.
- In the Super NES video game Secret of Evermore, the protagonist's pet dog takes the form of a robot in some areas.
- Sparky, from the 2023 Blumhouse film Five Nights at Freddy's.
- Spot, Olie Polie's pet robot dog in Rolie Polie Olie.
- The Mechanical Hound, a robotic hunter killer who serves the firemen as a scent hound in the book Fahrenheit 451. Its mouth conceals a syringe containing tranquilizers.
- Toby, the robot dog who was the companion of Halo Jones in the classic comic story The Ballad of Halo Jones.
- Yatterking, Yatterbull, and Yatteryokozuna three robotic dogs in Yatterman
- FENRIS Mechs from Mass Effect 2 and Mass Effect 3, also a DLC dog companion in ME3n
- Rex from Fallout: New Vegas, a "cyberhound" that can be recruited as a companion from The King in Freeside
- K-9 from Fallout 2, a "cyberdog" who was created by Dr. Schreber, available as a companion upon the player repairing it.
- Panzerhund, a deadly canine-looking robot employed by the Nazis in the Wolfenstein games from the 2009 game onward.
- Servo, a transforming robot emergency-response dog from Transformers: Rescue Bots.
- The main villain of Kingsman: The Golden Circle (2017) has two deadly robot dogs she named Jet and Bennie after the song of her idol Elton John.
- The 2017 Black Mirror episode "Metalhead" features a woman pursued by a deadly robotic dog, similar in design to the BigDog robot manufactured by Boston Dynamics.
- Wes Anderson's stop-motion animated feature Isle of Dogs features dog robots employed by the antagonists to assist their rescue teams and are later proposed as pets to replace real dogs.
- Blade Wolf, an AI (artificial intelligence) wolf-like robot created by World Marshal, an antagonistic private military company featured in the 2013 Konami video game Metal Gear Rising: Revengeance.

== In art ==
- Fairfield Industrial Dog Object, FIDO large animated Fairfield Australian dog sculpture

== In music ==
- MC Chris wrote a song named robotdog, describing his adventures with his robotic Aibo that takes over his life.

== Open source ==
- Open dog - open source robot by James Bruton
- LOTP Robot Dog V.2 by Halid YILDIRIM (open source)

== See also ==
- Companion robot
- Robot locomotion
- Virtual pet
