= Tekno the Robotic Puppy =

Robotic toy

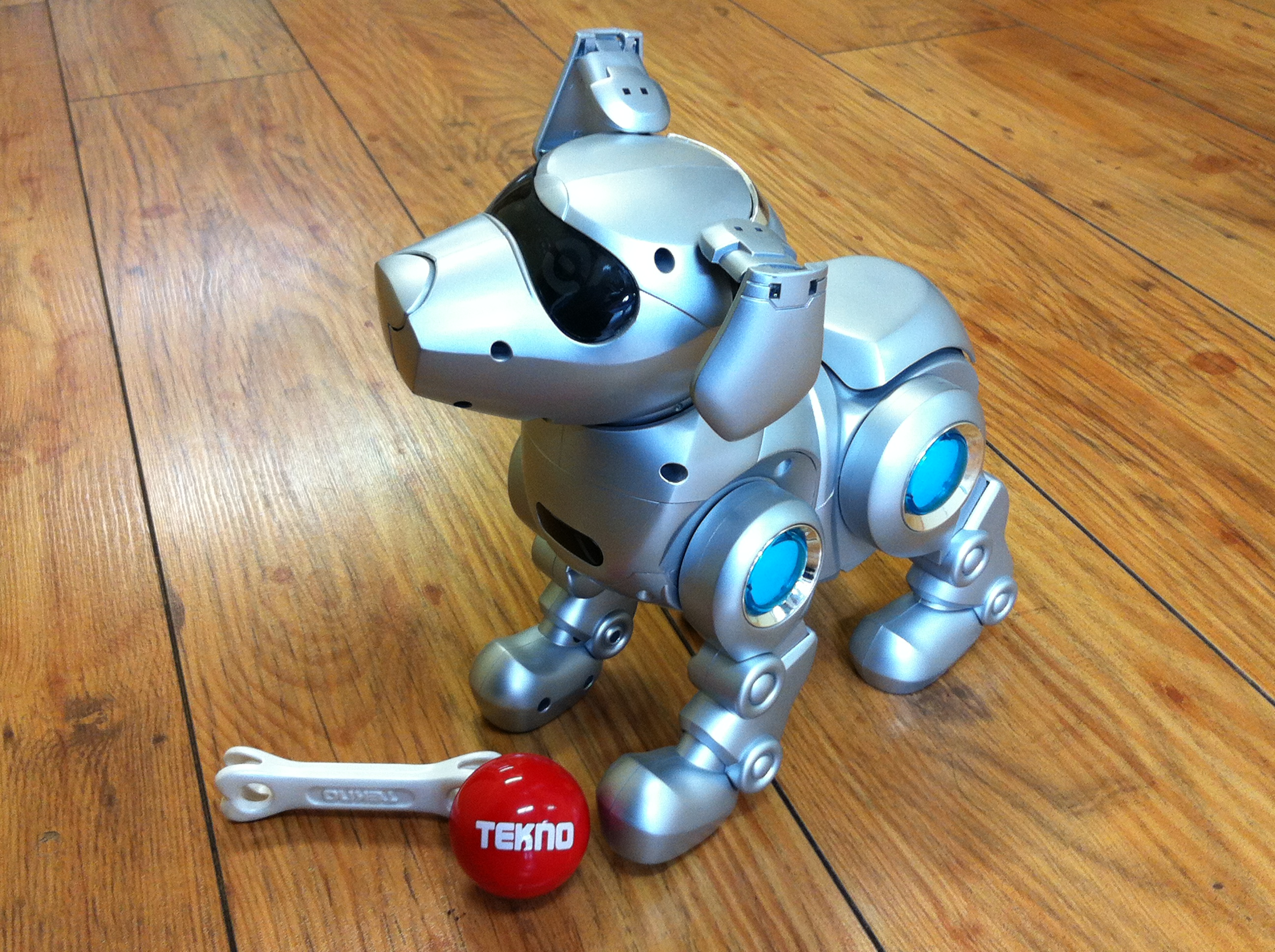
- Tekno with ball and bone accessories
- Type: Electronic robotic toy
- Invented by: Bob Del Principe, Brian Dubinsky, Gary Leynes
- Company: ToyQuest, Genesis Toys
- Country: US and UK
- Availability: 2000–onwards

Tekno the Robotic Puppy (also known as Teksta Interactive Robotic Puppy) is a popular electronic robotic toy which originally launched in late 2000. Tekno sold more than 7 million units in its first season and went on to sell more than 40 million units in its original 4 years of production. The worldwide popularity for Tekno led to prominent awards and widespread media coverage which included newspaper articles, television and film appearances, and a stand-alone feature on the cover of Time magazine.

It had more than 160 emotions and functions. Tekno's basic functions included walking, barking, eating, and sleeping, and special motor sensors simulated emotional and lifelike intelligence. It could be "taught" to respond to voice commands and to perform real dog tricks such as fetching, whining, and playing tricks with the included bone and ball accessories. Smart light sensor technology also gave Tekno the ability to understand visual commands and to react to environmental stimuli, even knowing when to go to sleep on its own.

== Development ==
Developed by Bob Del Principe, Brian Dubinksy, and designer Gary Leynes, Tekno launched in the fall of 2000 retailing for $39.99. Marketing efforts included a national television commercial campaign, traditional public relations, live talk show appearances, and the creation of the Institute of Robotic Technology to promote the world of robotics.

Entering a crowded toy pet market which included Rocket the Wonder Dog from Fisher-Price, and Poo-Chi, from Tiger Electronics and Sega, Tekno was named the best puppy for its value by Jim Silver of the popular magazine Toy Wishes.

== Later robot items ==
Additional pets and robots were launched. Other than Tekno the Newborn Puppy, the smaller version of Tekno. Here are the following robots ToyQuest launched:

=== Tekno the Newborn Puppy ===
The spin-off of Tekno the robotic puppy. It comes with a ball instead of a card trick.

=== Kitty the Tekno Kitten ===
==== 2001 ====
Originally sold exclusively to Toys “R” Us, Kitty the Tekno Kitten launched in 2001 and was advertised as the perfect companion to Tekno the Robotic Puppy. In addition to the smart technology included in the robotic puppy, Kitty included color-changing eyes to show different emotions. Kitty also came in several different colors and breeds making each one unique.

=== Baby Kitty the Tekno Newborn Kitten and daMouse the Tekno Mouse ===
It is the same prototype as the original Kitty and the Tekno mouse is "daMouse". daMouse is the robotic mouse who loves to race around and be chased by Kitty. It comes with cheese, fish, and small mouse.

=== Polly the Tekno Parrot ===
The third release in Tekno and Friends pet line was Polly, the Tekno Parrot. In comparison to previous Tekno pets, Polly was an edgier talkative robot with special voice learning technology to mimic and repeat its owner's words. Polly also came with a cage that doubled as a charging station for its batteries.

=== Rex and Steg, Fighting Tekno Dinosaurs ===
The fourth release in Tekno and Friends pet line which was released in 2003. They fight and win. Rex comes with a bone, and Steg comes with a leaf.

=== Tekno Dinkie Robots/Teksta Dotbot Robotic Family ===
The fifth release in Tekno and Friends robot line were Fubo^Kie, Jibo^Kie, Suki^Kie, Oto^Kie, Koukou^Kie, and Bikou^Kie. These artificial intelligence and voice activated robots interact with each other and talk in "Dinkish" language. They are like astronauts but with the sound sensors and red fuel buttons. Every robot likes to walk except Koukou^Kie (he rocks left and right). The game modes in each Dinkie Robot are clock, alarm, song, game, status, brush teeth, anti-virus, and walk. In the United Kingdom, it is Teksta Dotbots. And in Japan, it is Palbo Dinka Robots created by Tomy.

=== Battling Tekno Saber Scarab ===
The sixth release in Tekno and Friends pet line was a saber scarab. Comes with a remote control.

=== Boomer the Robotic Puppy ===
The first Tekno 2.0 pet which is a beagle or dalmatian. Comes with a ball and steak.

=== Mack the Robotic Fish ===
The second Tekno 2.0 pet which swims on floor surface and table surface. It cannot swim in water.

=== Roscoe the Robotic Frog ===
The third Tekno 2.0 pet. It leaps instead of walking. Comes with a lilypad and a fly hooked on it.

=== Flash the Robotic Turtle ===
The fourth Tekno 2.0 pet, which walks slower than other models. If the owner takes off his shell, he would say "Uh Oh!".

=== Tekno the Robotic Pony ===
The 2007 release in the Tekno and Friends pet line. Tekno gallops and can "eat" apples.

=== Tekno Mega Mech R/C Robot 48-Inch ===
An inflatable huge Tekno robot. Comes with a remote control and rolls instead of walks.

=== Sakura: Best Friend Robot ===
Originally sold by Toys R'Us, Walmart, KB Toys, Amazon, and Target.com. The 2007 release in the Tekno and Friends robot line was Sakura. Sakura interact with girls or boys and answers yes and no questions, doing fortune telling, knows funny facts, fashion, keeping secrets using her key and remote, and dances on a robotic scooter. Sakura comes with a robotic scooter, remote, key with keychain, and bouquet.

=== Playful Pup Tekno ===
The 2007 release in the Tekno and Friends Pet line was a beagle. It was controlled by remote and comes with a magnetic ball or bone.

=== Tekno Newborns ===
==== 2007 ====
The 2007 release in the Tekno and Friends Pet line were puppy, kitten, elephant, and monkey. The puppy comes with the bone, kitty comes with the mouse, elephant comes with the haystack, and the monkey comes with the banana.

=== Releases under Genesis Toys ===
Sometime in early 2010s ToyQuest stopped producing their robots. Newer Tekno/Teksta robots made afterwards were made by Gensis Toys in UK. Their first releases were the Tekno Robotic Puppy in 2013 as well as the Tekno Robotic Kitty in 2014, all being white instead of silver. Some of their other releases can be controlled by a smart device. Their releases includes:

- Tekno/Teksta Robotic T-Rex (2014)
- Teksta/Tekno Robotic Scorpion (2015)
- Teksta/Tekno Newborns (2015)
- Teksta Robotic Toucan (2016)
- Teksta Micropets (2017)
- Teksta 360 (2019)

== Timeline of editions ==
- The 2000 version comes in silver, gold, and dalmatian (black and white).
- The 2007 version comes in white, silver, dalmatian, beagle (brown, black and white), red, and purple.

== See also ==
- AIBO
- Cindy Smart
- Musio
- I-Cybie
