= Cindy Smart =

Doll brand

- Type: Doll
- Invented by: Bob Del Principe
- Company: Toy Quest
- Country: United States

Cindy Smart is a brand of doll manufactured by Manley Toy Quest. Introduced in 2002, Cindy Smart was the first doll that could see, capable of reading words in five languages, do basic math, and could tell time. The doll was first sold in the United States, and then in Australia beginning in 2003.

== Capabilities ==
Cindy Smart has the appearance of a standard female doll. The doll is 18.5 inches (47.0 cm) tall with blonde hair and blue eyes, and is intended to appear five years of age. Cindy Smart differs from other dolls because of her extra equipment, which includes: a digital camera in the doll's torso, a 16-bit microprocessor in the stomach, and voice-recognition software. The camera makes Cindy Smart the first doll that can see.

When someone speaks to Cindy Smart, the software attempts to match the speech to one of 70 preprogrammed commands. If the command calls for reading, the digital camera searches for text in a 15-degree sector in front of it. The microprocessors compare the text with a database of words. The doll then gives the word and its spelling aloud, unless the word is an expletive. The doll can recognize 650 English words, as well as some French, German, Italian, and Spanish words. The doll can also do basic math, recognize shapes and colors, and tell time.

== History ==
Toymaker Bob Del Principe spent 10 years working on Cindy Smart. He completed the doll in 2002, when he was Vice President for Research and Development at a Los Angeles subsidiary of Manley Toy Quest, a Hong Kong–based toy manufacturing company. The doll was first sold in the United States for US$99, with a number of sales coming through the Home Shopping Network.

Manley Toy Quest expanded sales to Australia beginning on 19 August 2003 with a launch event at a Myer department store in Melbourne. The Australian version uses Commonwealth spelling and says "Mum" instead of the American "Mom", but otherwise retains her American English dialect. The doll first sold for AU$149 in Australia.

== Reception ==
Several news outlets, including The New York Times and Wired, compared Cindy Smart to Chatty Cathy, which was the first talking doll and influential in the toy business. Wired and The Sydney Morning Herald also compared Cindy Smart to I-Cybie, the first widely available toy to accept voice commands. Time named Cindy Smart to its list of the 42 best inventions of 2002, praising her technical capabilities but calling her "a little creepy". Wired also called her "a little creepy".

Cindy Smart was a modest financial success. The Australian Financial Review named it a "must-have" for Christmas 2003.

== See also ==
- List of toys
- Musio
- Tekno the Robotic Puppy
