= Genibo =

Robotic dog

Genibo (Korean: 제니보) is a robotic dog produced by the Korean company Dasarobot of Dasatech.

== GENIBO QD ==
The Genibo QD is an autonomous pet robot, similar in concept to Sony's 'ERS-7' Aibo, but was created to be much more dog-like in appearance and behavior.

Modeled to resemble a Bull Terrier, the Genibo QD can identify itself and the surroundings using its sensors, camera, and voice commands and share feelings with the user. With input information, it forms 'Emotion/Mood/Intelligence/Character/Intimacy' to feature unique character and AI.

The Genibo QD is capable of understanding over 100 voice commands (such as "sit", "come here" and "do a headstand") and has the ability to praise or scold the dog using the touch sensors located on its head, back and flank. The dogs mood will change according to user interaction and can express happiness, pleasure, sadness, surprise, anger, boredom and sleepiness.

The Genibo QD comes with PC Control Manager software that allows you to see a live view of what the dog is seeing, take photos, create skits/dance routines, record voice memos, MP3 playback, and set alarms.

Genibo was originally released as a prototype in 2006 and was made available to the public in 2008 for about US$1500. The newer 2009 Genibo QD robots come with English computer software and remote as well as the ability to understand English voice commands as where the previous models could only understand Korean.

== Specifications ==
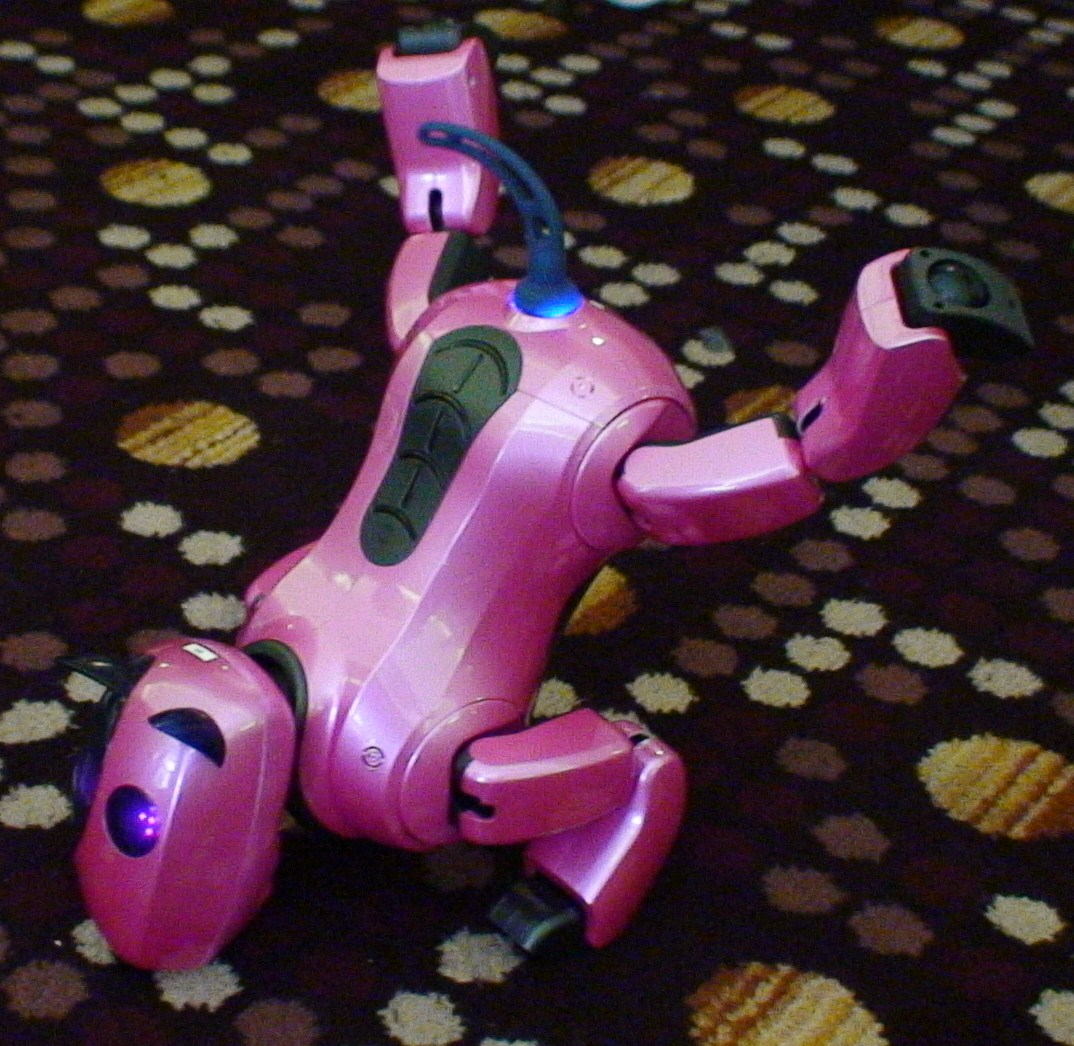
Genibo Headstand.

Technical specifications
| CPU | 32-bit RISC Proc |
| Battery | 7.4V Li-ion, 2,200 mAh |
| Charger adapter | 110 - 240 V: 50 – 60 Hz (Universal Supply) output at 9 V, 2.5 A |
| Camera | 1.3 M pixel, 1280 x 1024 |
| Camera frame rate | 15 fps, Jpeg |
| Voice recognition | 100 commands |
| Touch sensors | head nose back left and right flanks |
| Other | real-time clock tilt sensor 4 paw sensors 3 color LED eye displays (31 LEDs each eye) |
| Connectivity | WLAN |
| Width | 192 mm |
| Length | 334 mm |
| Height | 330 mm |
| Weight | 1.6 kg (inc battery) |

== See also ==
- South Korean robotics
- Economy of South Korea
- Manufacturing in South Korea
- Science and technology in South Korea
- Domestic robot
- i-Cybie, another robotic dog
- QRIO, a humanoid robot also developed by Sony
- Musio
- Asimo, a humanoid robot
- Pleo, robotic dinosaur
- Nao, a humanoid robot replacing aibo in robocup competitions
