= IDog =

Robot dog toy designed and manufactured by Sega Toys

iDog
- Type: Robot dog
- Company: Sega Toys; Tiger Electronics
- Country: Japan
- Availability: 2005–2009
- Slogan: Beggin' for the Beat Beggin’ for the Best (Germany, Italy, and the Netherlands)
- Official website

The iDog (stylized as i-Dog) is a robot dog toy designed and manufactured by Sega Toys. An iDog figure receives input from an external music source, such as an MP3 player or iPod, and will light up and "dance" to the music's rhythm. It is marketed as the eDog in Germany, Italy and the Netherlands.

== Basic iDog ==
The iDog reacts to music from an external source, such as an external speaker or through a direct connection to a music source such as an MP3 player or iPod. It features seven flashing LED lights on its face and has the ability to "dance" to the beat of the music by intermittently wiggling its ears, moving its foot and tilting its head around. It also has a number of switches on its nose, head and tail which allow it to react to user input. It has various "emotions" (which change based on user interaction) that provide different color patterns on its LED lights.

The iDog began shipping worldwide between March and April 2005. The iDog comes in several colors including white, black, pink, red, lime green, blue, a tiger print, and a dalmatian print. Decorative clothing for the iDog has been released, including feet-warmers, ear-warmers and scarves, as well as carry-along handbags.

=== Variations ===
Green McDonald's toy version of the iDog, purchased in Romania, July 2007

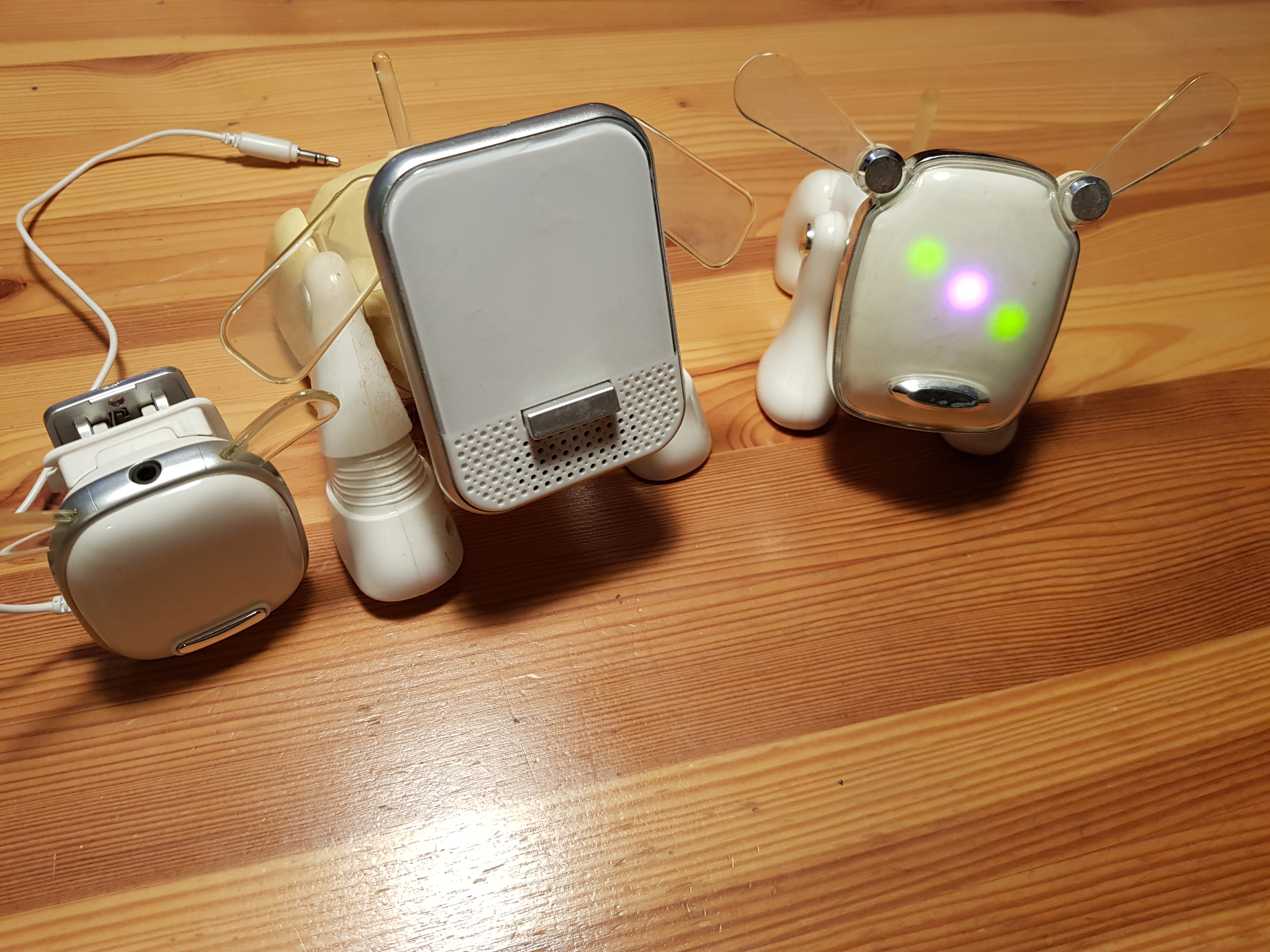
White versions of the iDog Clip (left), iDog Dance (middle) and the original iDog (right)

In 2005, Sega partnered with Atmos Tokyo to produce sports-themed iDogs as part of a new line, titled "iDog x Atmos". In 2007, Tiger Electronics released the iDog Amp'd, an upgraded version of the iDog with stereo speakers that nod its head and tap its foot in time with the music being played. The iDog Pup, a puppy version of the iDog with posable ears and a moving head, was released in 2006 and was a localized version of the iDog Mini released in Japan in 2005. Also in 2007, two variants called "SpiDogs" were released to promote the film Spider-Man 3. They resemble the standard red Spider-Man costume and the black costume.

In 2008, three new versions of the iDog were released. The iDog Clip is a fully functional mini-sized iDog which can be clipped onto a backpack, the iDog Dance is a larger version of the iDog that stands up and dances in time to the music, it also features 7 touch sensors (like the iCat), and the iDog Soft Speaker, a plush version of the iDog Amp'd that remixes some songs on it and has a pocket where the battery compartment is so you can store things in it. iDog variants based on the band Kiss were also released that year. In 2009, as one of the last iDogs released, Hasbro released the iDog Plush Puppy. This smaller plush iDog came in pink and purple and was one of the first iDogs that didn't need batteries. It came with a cord attached to it, like the iDog Clip, but it had the light patterns stitched onto it.

As part of a promotion with McDonald's internationally, sets of iDog-based toys were included in Happy Meals in 2007. In 2007 and 2008, Burger King had a promotion which included miniature models with stickers representing the dots. A Japan-exclusive set of six Happy Meal toys in collaboration with Quiksilver and Roxy were released in April 2010.

== Alternate models ==
=== iCat ===
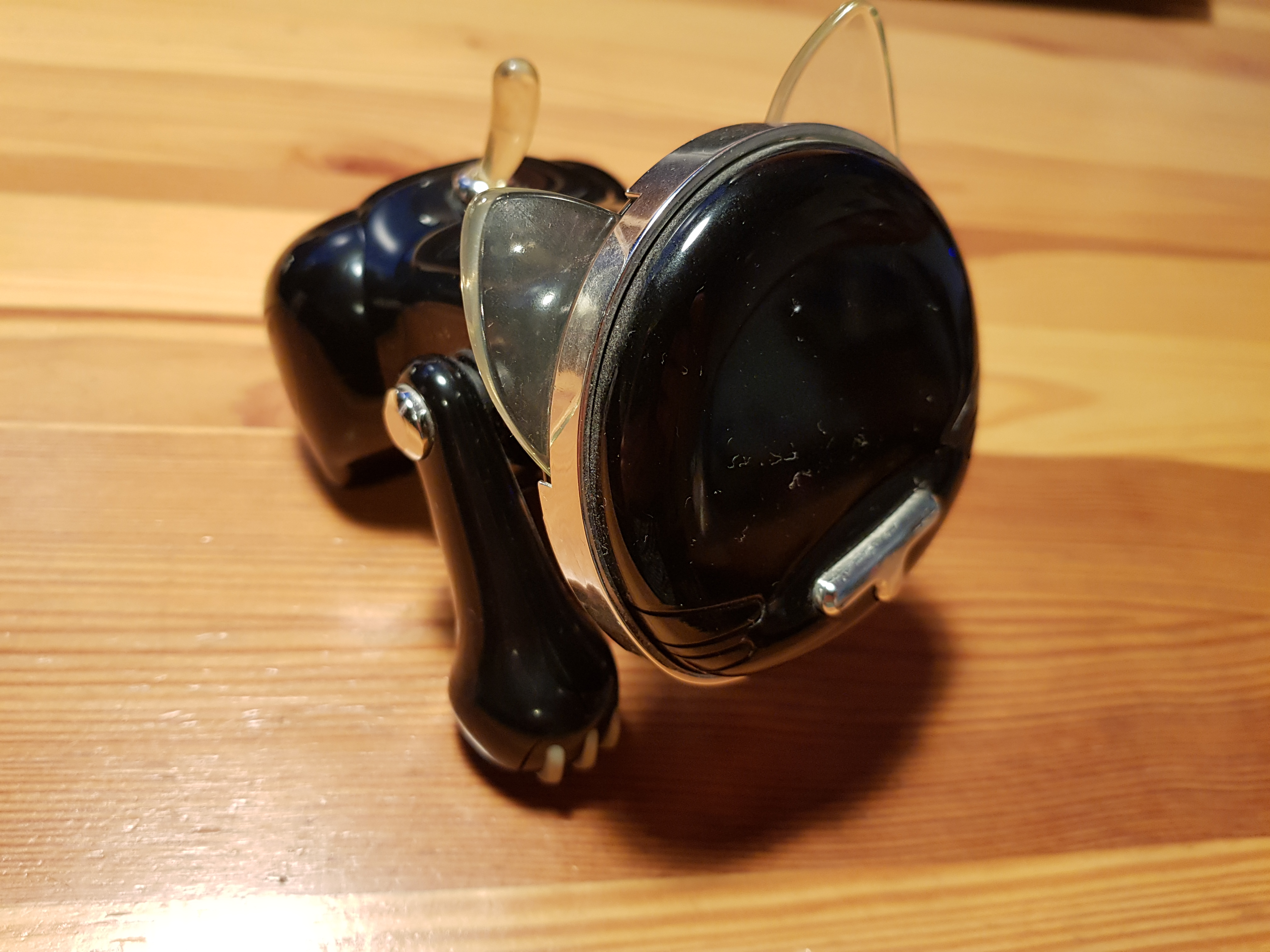
Black iCat

The iCat is a feline version of the iDog. Similar to the iDog, it reacts to music from an external source. It features seven flashing LED lights (like the iDog) on its face and has the ability to "dance" to the beat of the music. It also has switches on its tail, head (nose), and 7 touch sensors which allow it to react to user input. Like the iDog, its LED light color patterns display various "emotions" based on user interaction and the music played.

=== iFish ===
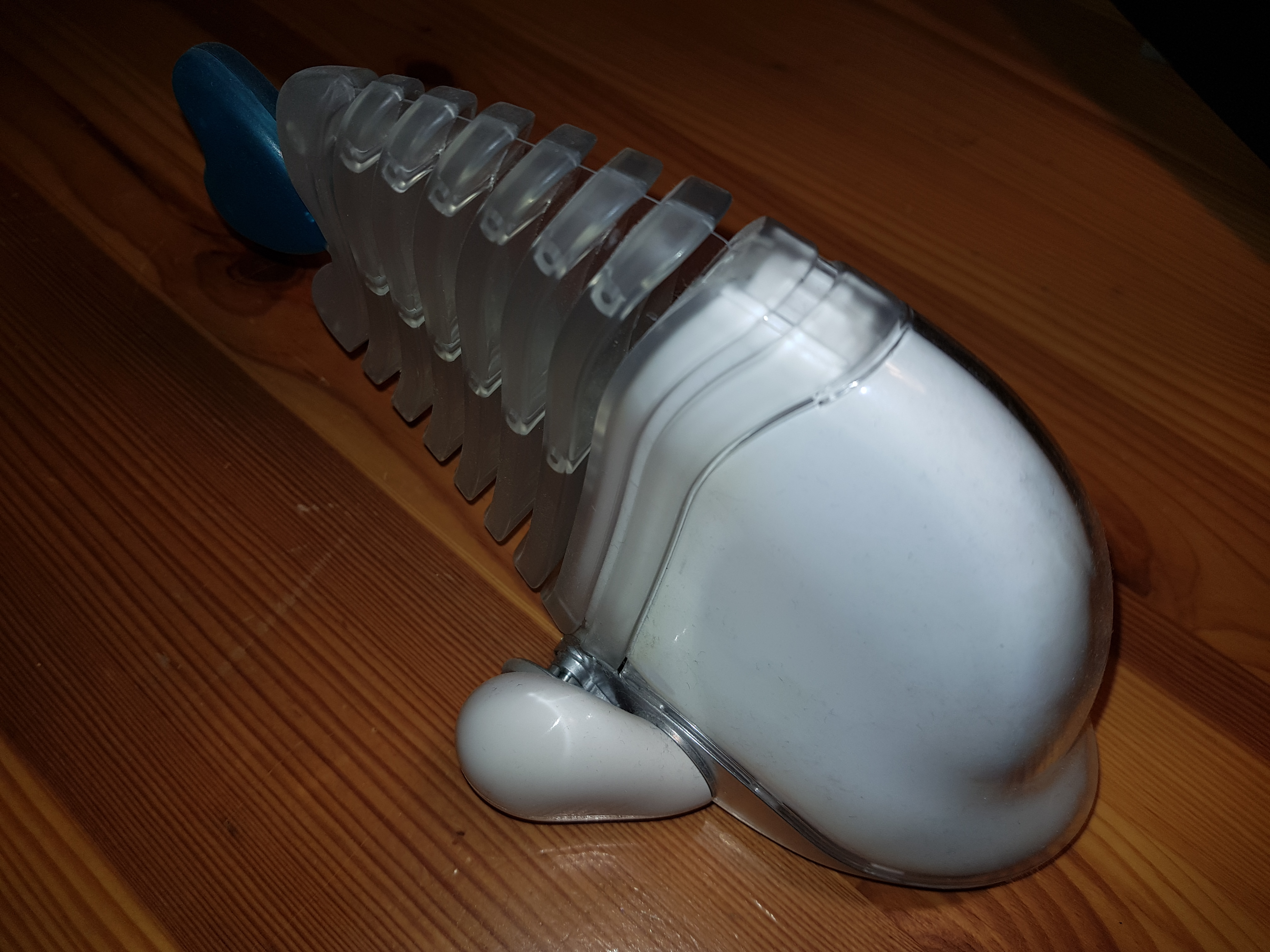
White variant of iFish

A piscine version of the iDog, the iFish plays music and moves in a swimming-like motion. The iFish also has an internal selection of music. The iFish comes with a blue or orange tail fin, with a 3.5 mm audio cable for audio input. Like the iDog, it is touch-sensitive. It has a flaw where the iFish can get tangled in its own cord due to it being wired.

=== iCy ===
The iCy, marketed as the iPenguin in select countries, is a penguin version of the iDog. In addition to playing music, it dances and the LED lights on its stomach flash in time to the music. Unlike its predecessors, it has only two touch sensors for user interaction: its tail, which is designed to "annoy" it rather than "reward" it, and its beak, which is used to "pet" it. It has various "emotions" which change based on user interaction and music played.

=== iTurtle ===
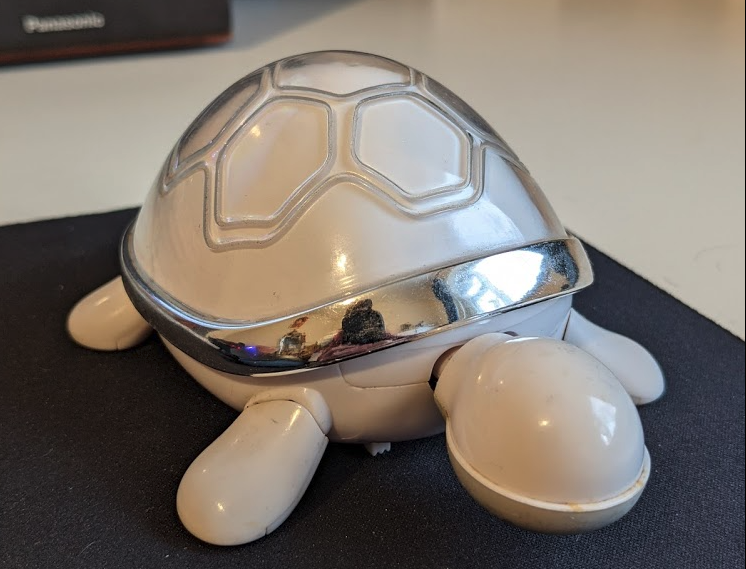
iTurtle

The iTurtle is a turtle version of the iDog. It also comes with a plug cable (3.5 mm) with 2 touch sensors on its tail and head. It moves its shell up and down, shakes its head side to side, and taps its foot. It has the same features as others except its moods are modified.

== Viral marketing ==
In 2006, UK musician Jesta was inspired to write a song focusing on the product, titled "Me, My Music & My iDog." That same year, as part of the Daily Source Code podcast, host Adam Curry spoke about the iDog.

== See also ==
- AIBO
- Poo-Chi
