= Wappy Dog =

2011 video game

- Wappy Dog North American box art
- Developer: MTO
- Publishers: Sega Toys; Activision
- Platforms: Nintendo DS; Nintendo 3DS (Japan)
- Release: November 8, 2011: NA: November 8, 2011; EU: September 7, 2012; AU: September 7, 2012; JP: July 31, 2014
- Genre: Pet simulation
- Mode: Single-player

Wappy Dog, known in Japan as Heart Energy Poochi (ハートエナジープーチ, Haato Enajii Puuchi), is a 2011 pet simulation video game developed by MTO and published by Sega Toys and Activision for the Nintendo DS. The game makes use of a robot dog toy that can connect to the system. It was released three years later in Japan for the Nintendo 3DS, exclusively as a download code that comes with the toy. Wappy Dog is based upon an earlier robot dog from Sega Toys, Poo-Chi. Critical reception of the game was mixed.

== Gameplay ==
Wappy Dog uses a robotic dog toy that connects to the Nintendo DS system, allowing the player to raise their puppy in both the real and virtual worlds. Players are able to teach their dog tricks, as well as play various minigames such as fortune telling and rock-paper-scissors. How Wappy develops as it grows is determined by the way the game is played, with the user giving commands to Wappy virtually using the DS's screen, which Wappy can respond to both virtually and physically.

Wappy can respond to the player's conversational prompts with barks, which the game translates. The color of Wappy's cheeks reflect its current mood. Its reactions vary depending on where it is pet, for example, petting its tail makes it sad. It has five unique growth stages spanning a puppy to an adult dog. Wappy can also sing 16 different songs, as well as dance.

The game has two modes, "Home Mode", in which the player uses both the DS and the toy to interact with Wappy, and "Travel Mode", allowing the player to continue playing on the DS when they don't have access to the physical toy. Wappy's progress will update as soon as the player returns to Home Mode. In Japanese, this is referred to as transferring Wappy's "heart".

== Reception ==
Wappy Dog received mixed reception from critics. Pocket Gamer's Peter Willington gave it a 2/5, calling it "almost unbelievably" underwhelming, and referring to the Wappy toy as "largely useless". When discussing the minigames, he says "you've seen it all before, and better." Common Sense Media rated it a 4/5, calling it a "unique virtual pet romp". Reviewer Mark Raby goes on to say that "aspiring pet owners will no doubt find the charm and novelty of this game well worth it", and notes that while the robot is not very advanced, it does what it needs to for the purpose of the game. Writing for IGN, Brian Altano called Wappy's design "creepy, ominous and terrifyingly out of scale" on the box art. Mike Fahey of Kotaku called it a brilliant idea, comparing Wappy to R.O.B., "only a great deal cuter".
