= Intel Museum =

Computer museum in Santa Clara, California

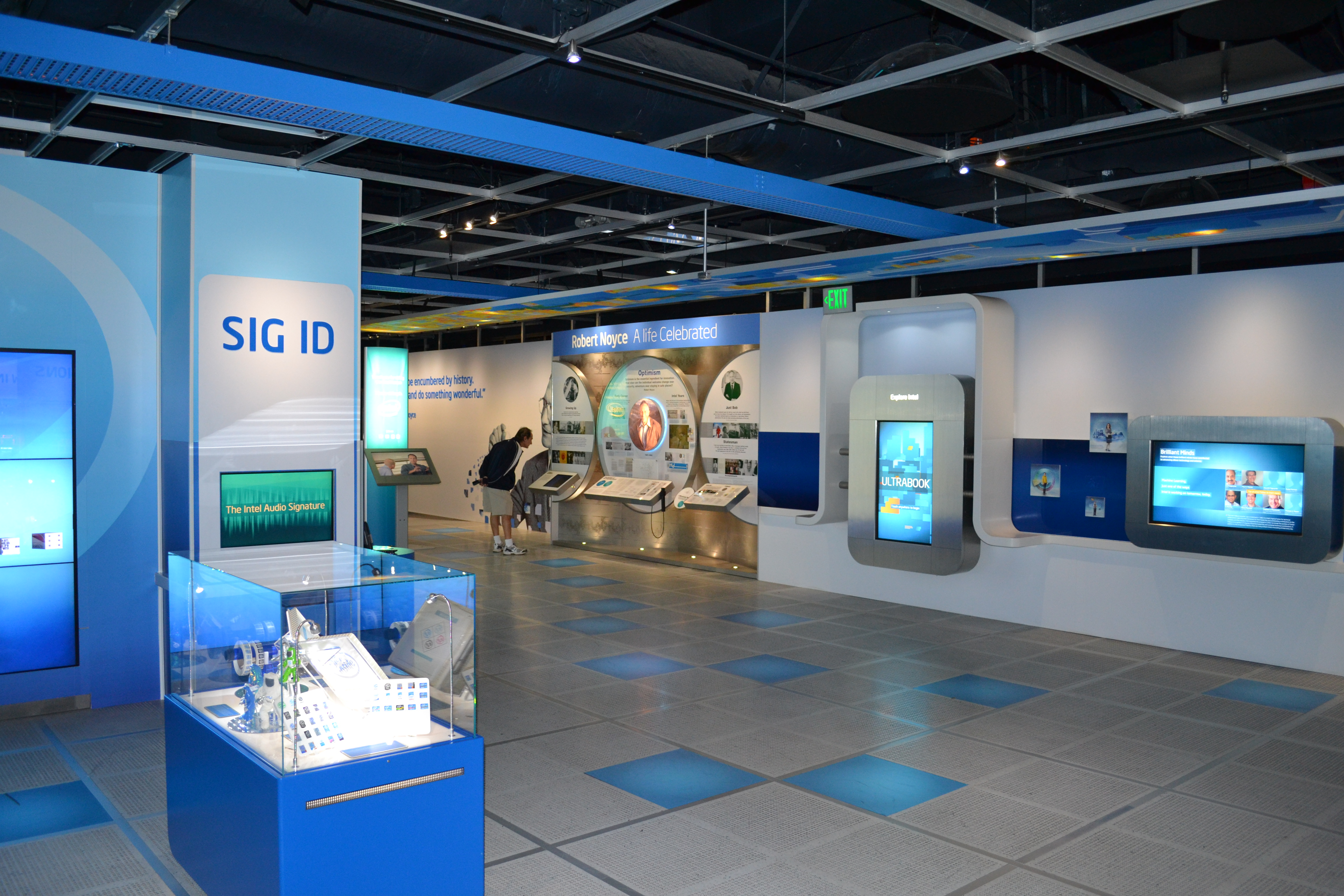

- Location within California
- Established: 1992
- Location: Santa Clara, California, US
- Coordinates: 37°23′15″N 121°57′49″W
- Website: www.intel.com/museum

The Intel Museum, located at Intel's headquarters in Santa Clara, California, United States, has exhibits of Intel's products and history as well as semiconductor technology in general. The museum is open weekdays except holidays. It is open to the public with free admission.The museum was started in the early 1980s as an internal project at Intel to record its history. It opened to the public in February 13, 1992, later being expanded in 1999 to triple its size and add a store. It has exhibits about how semiconductor chip technology works, both as self-paced exhibits and by reservation as grade-school educational programs.

== Gallery ==
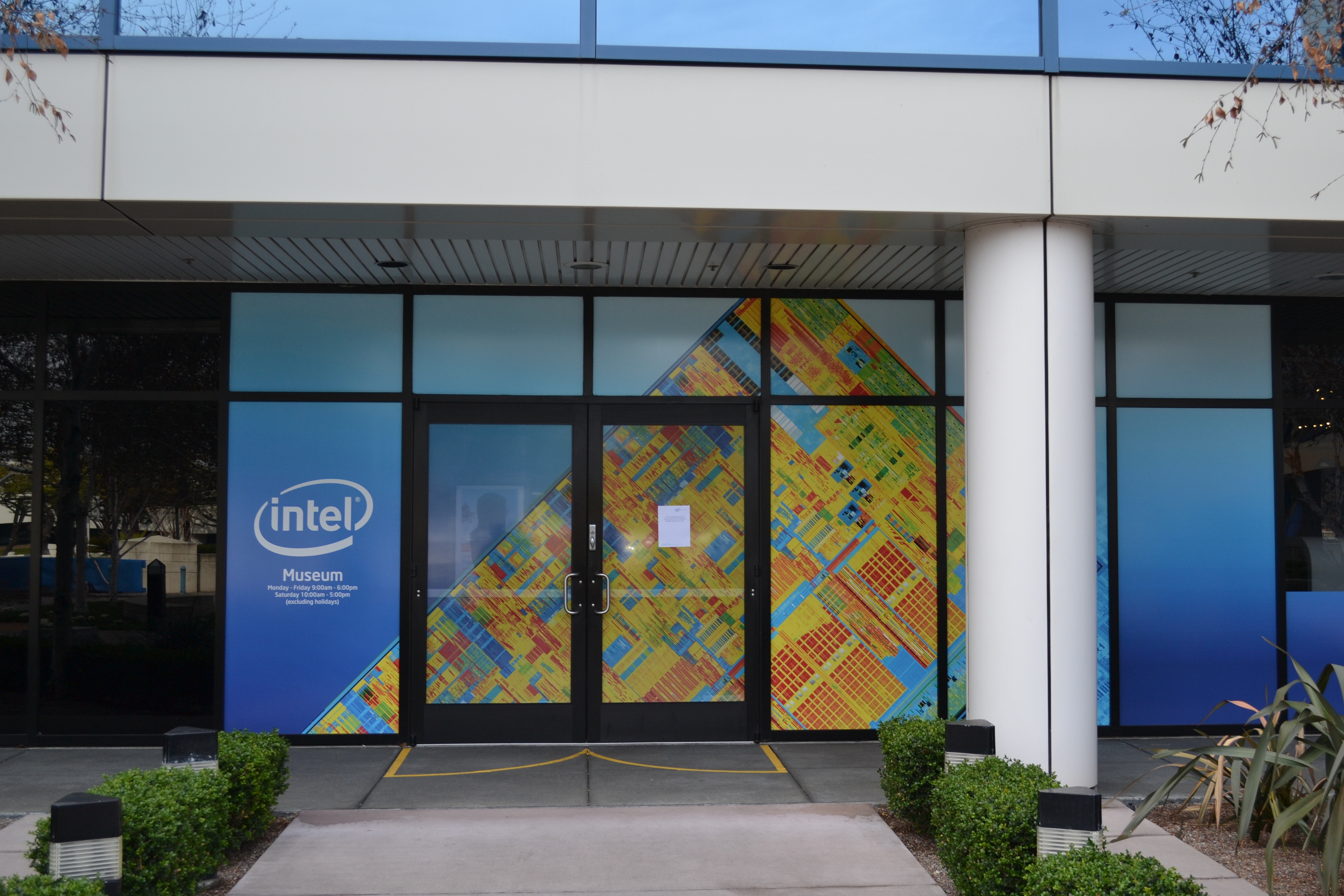
Museum entrance

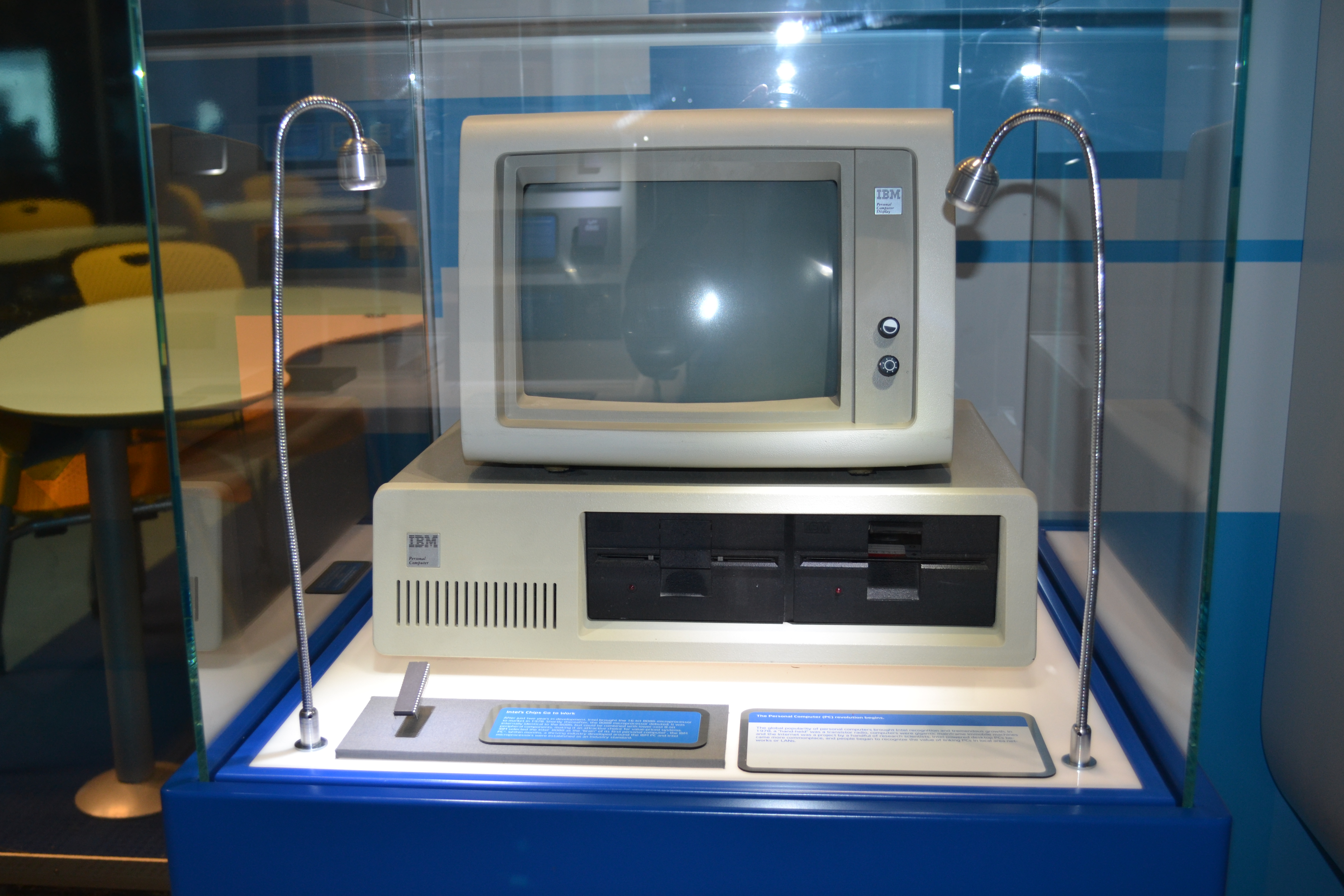
The original IBM PC containing the Intel 8088 microprocessor

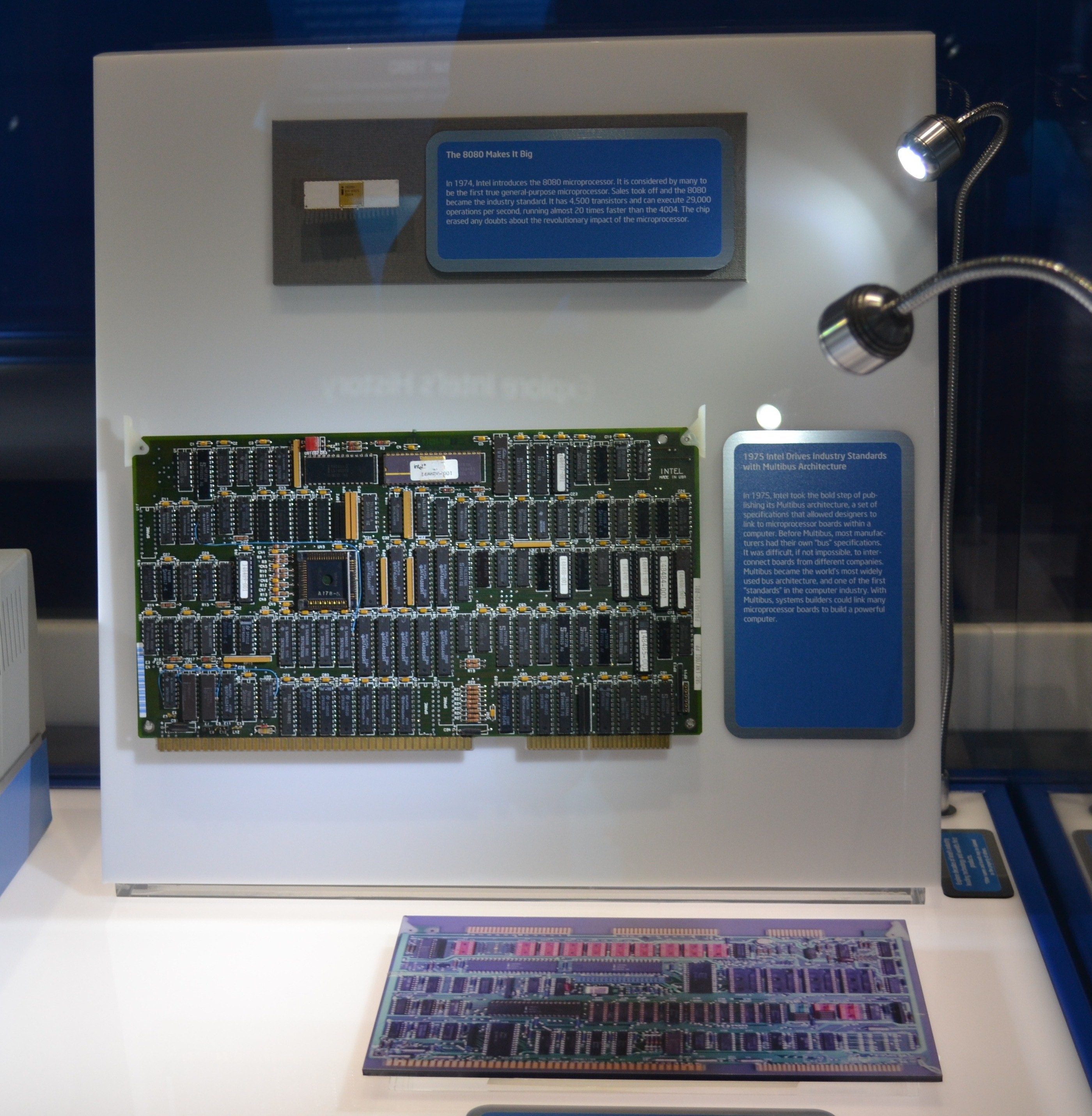
Intel 8080 microprocessor and a microprocessor board

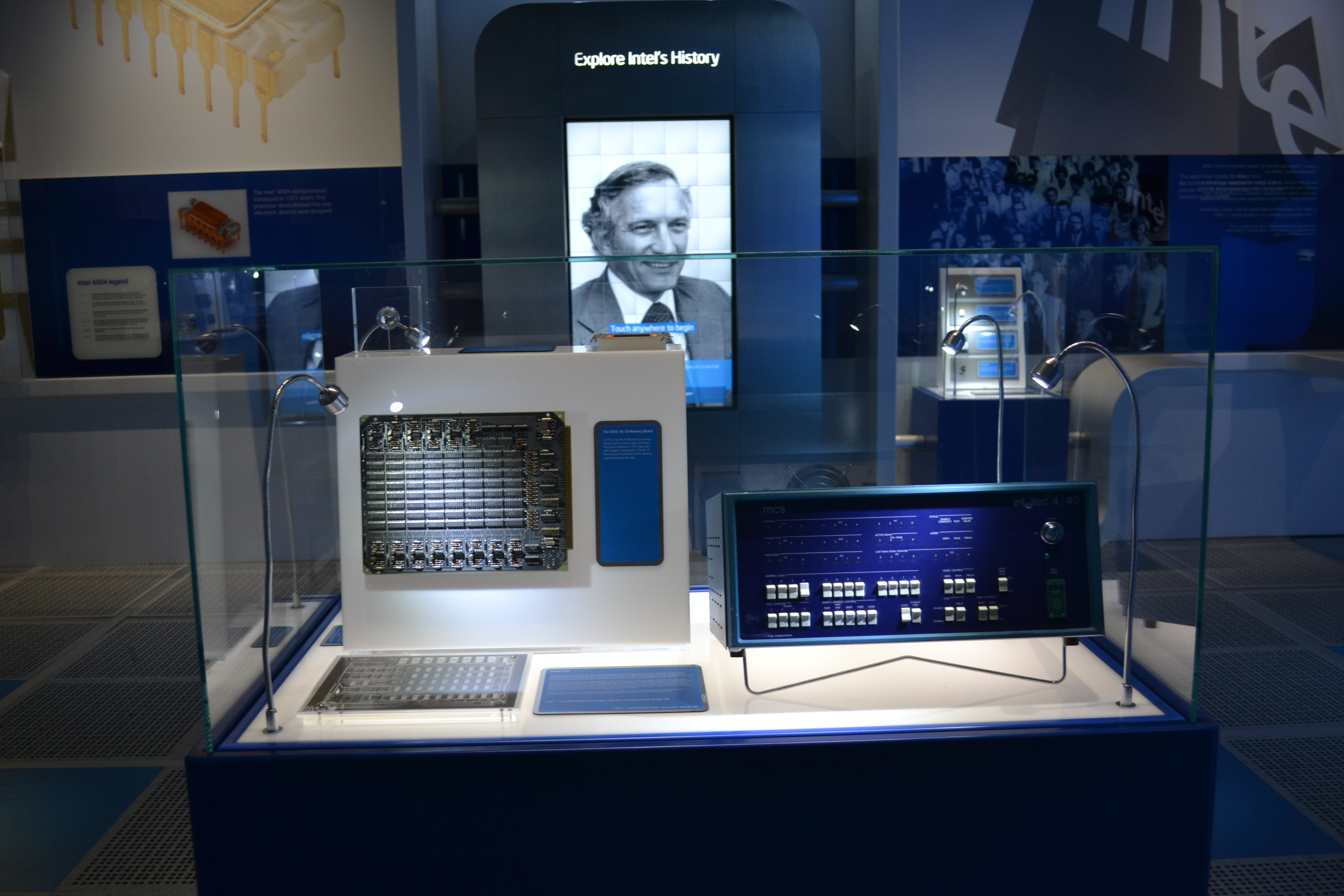
Intel IN-10 Memory Board

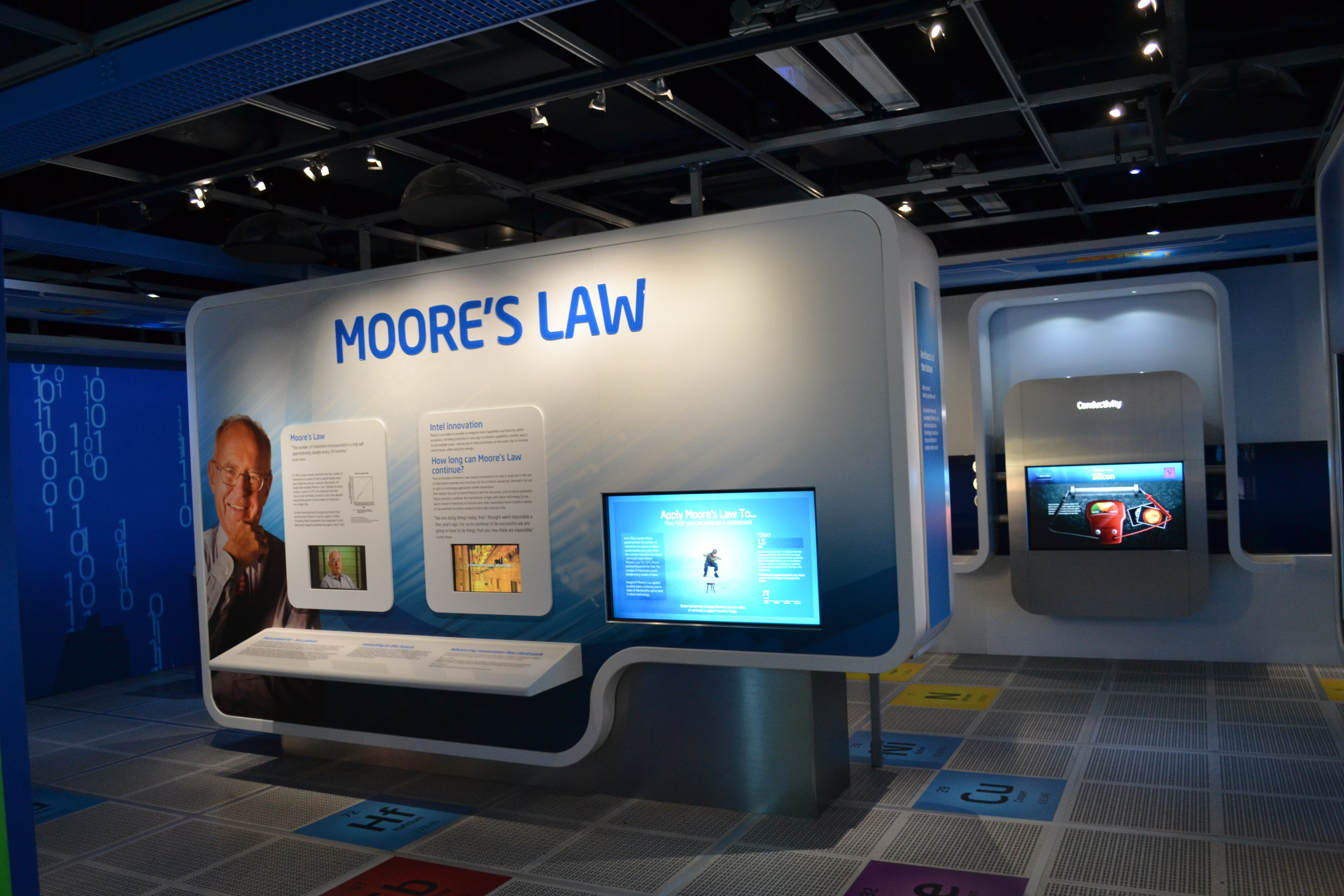
Moore's Law exhibit

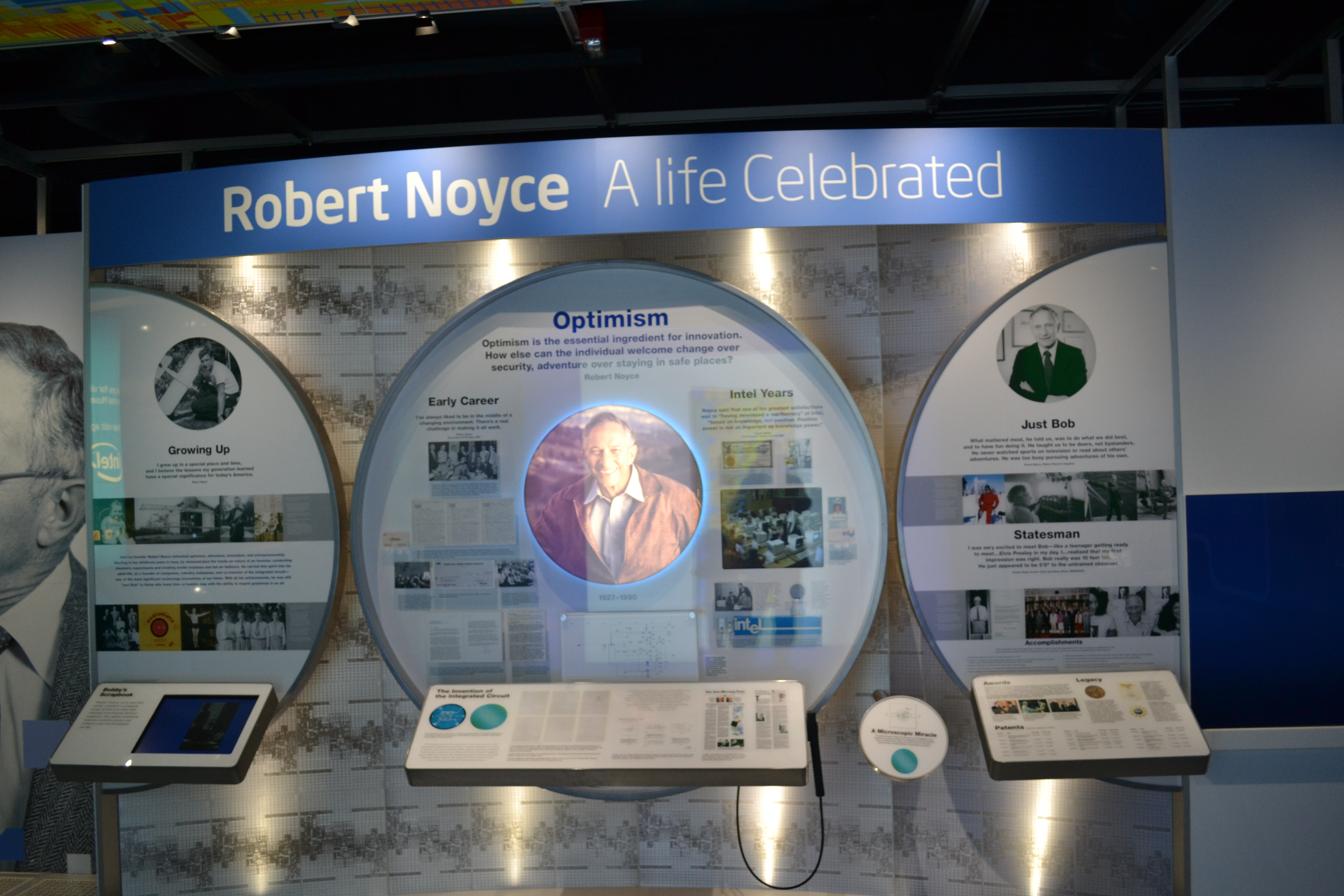
Robert Noyce exhibition

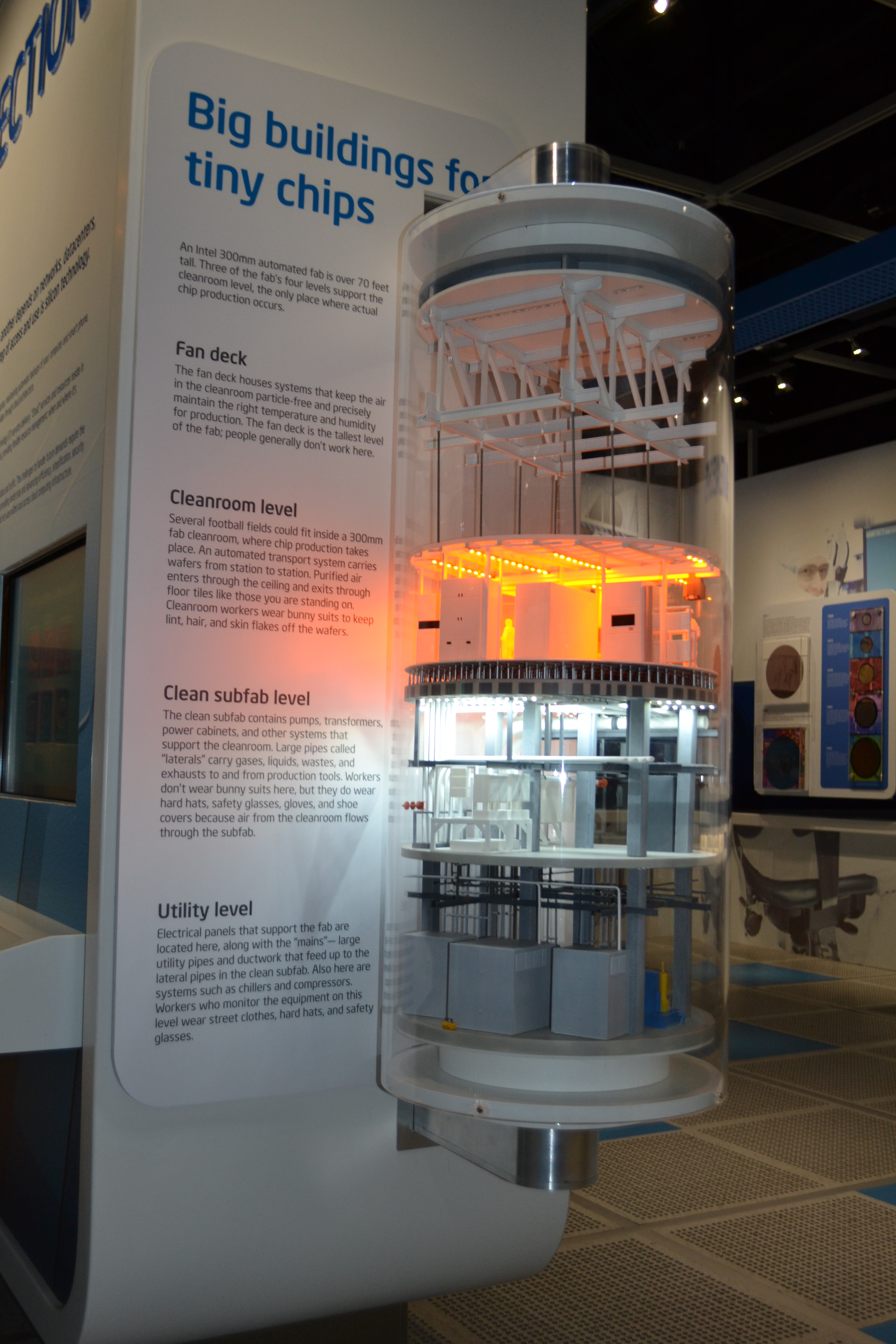
Semiconductor fab model

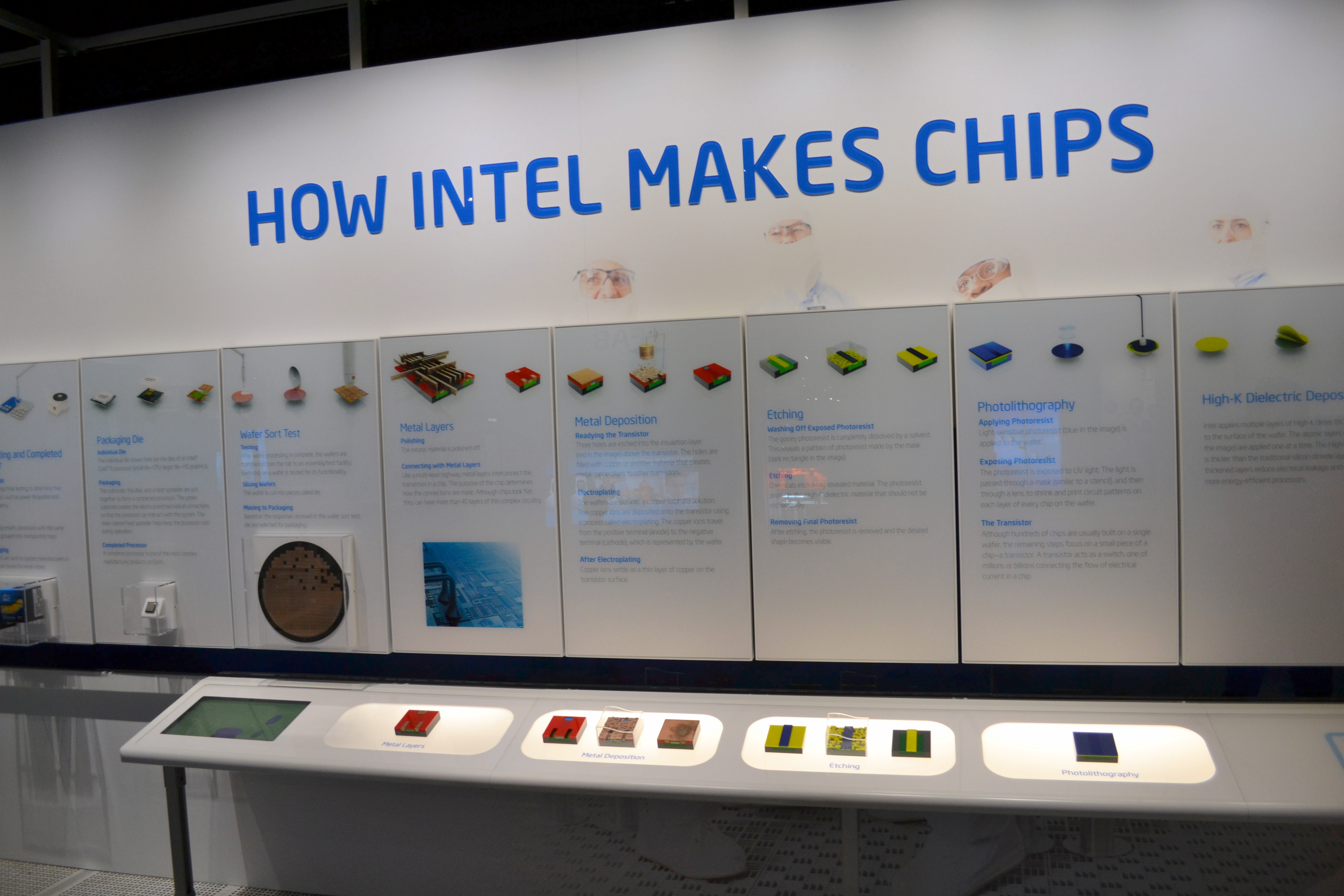
Description of the chip-making process

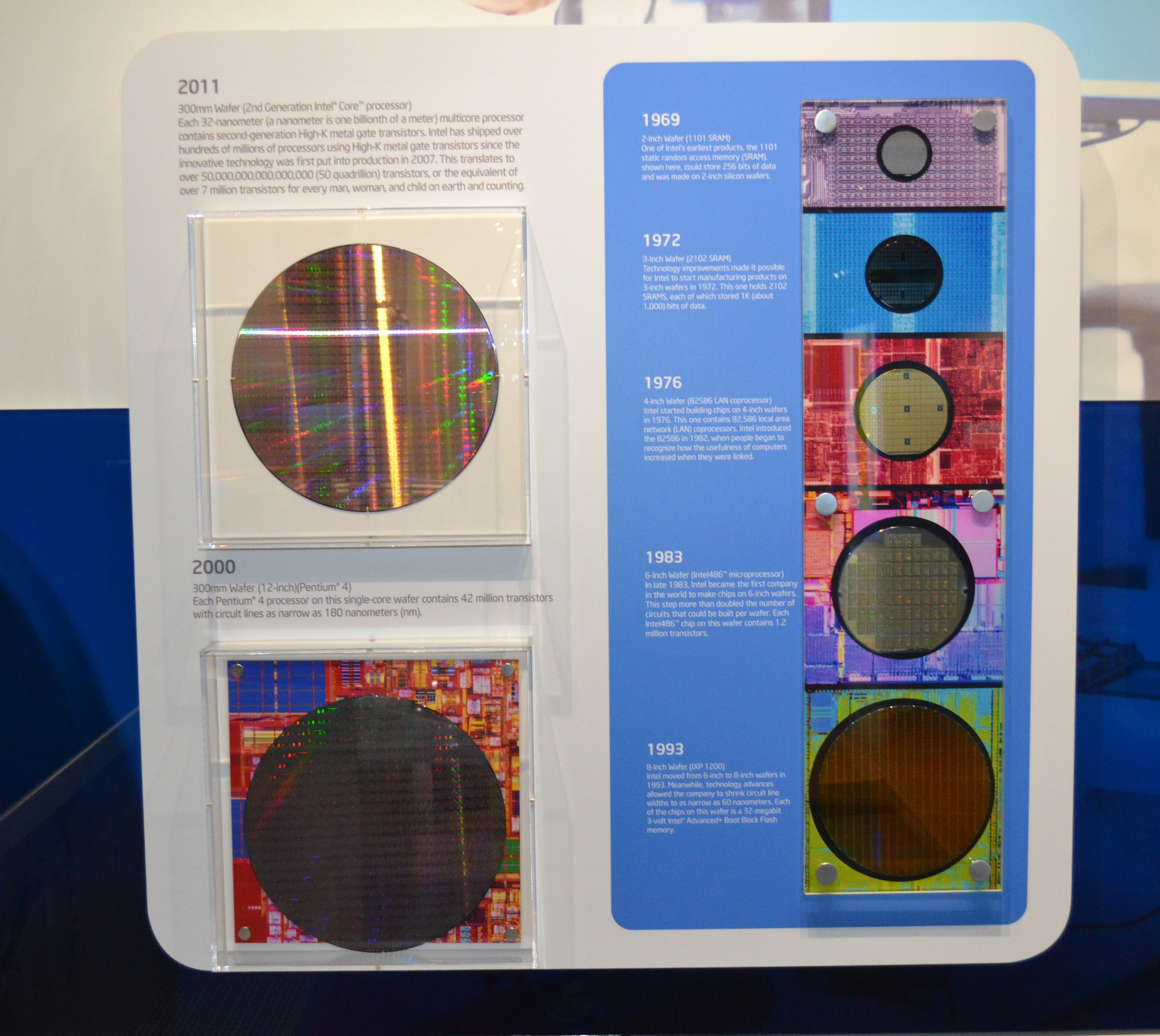
Silicon wafers showing their gradual increase in size over time

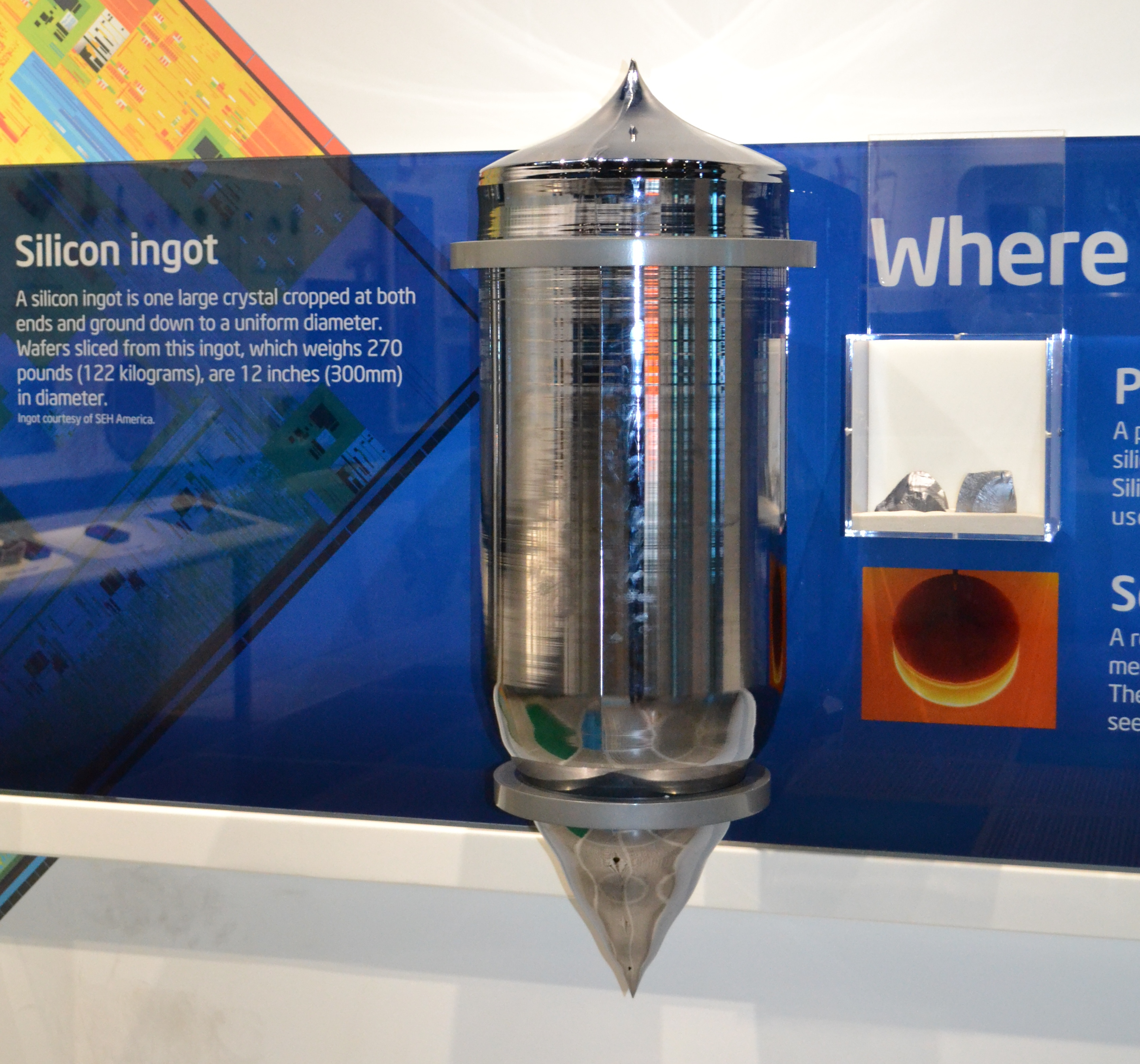
Silicon ingot

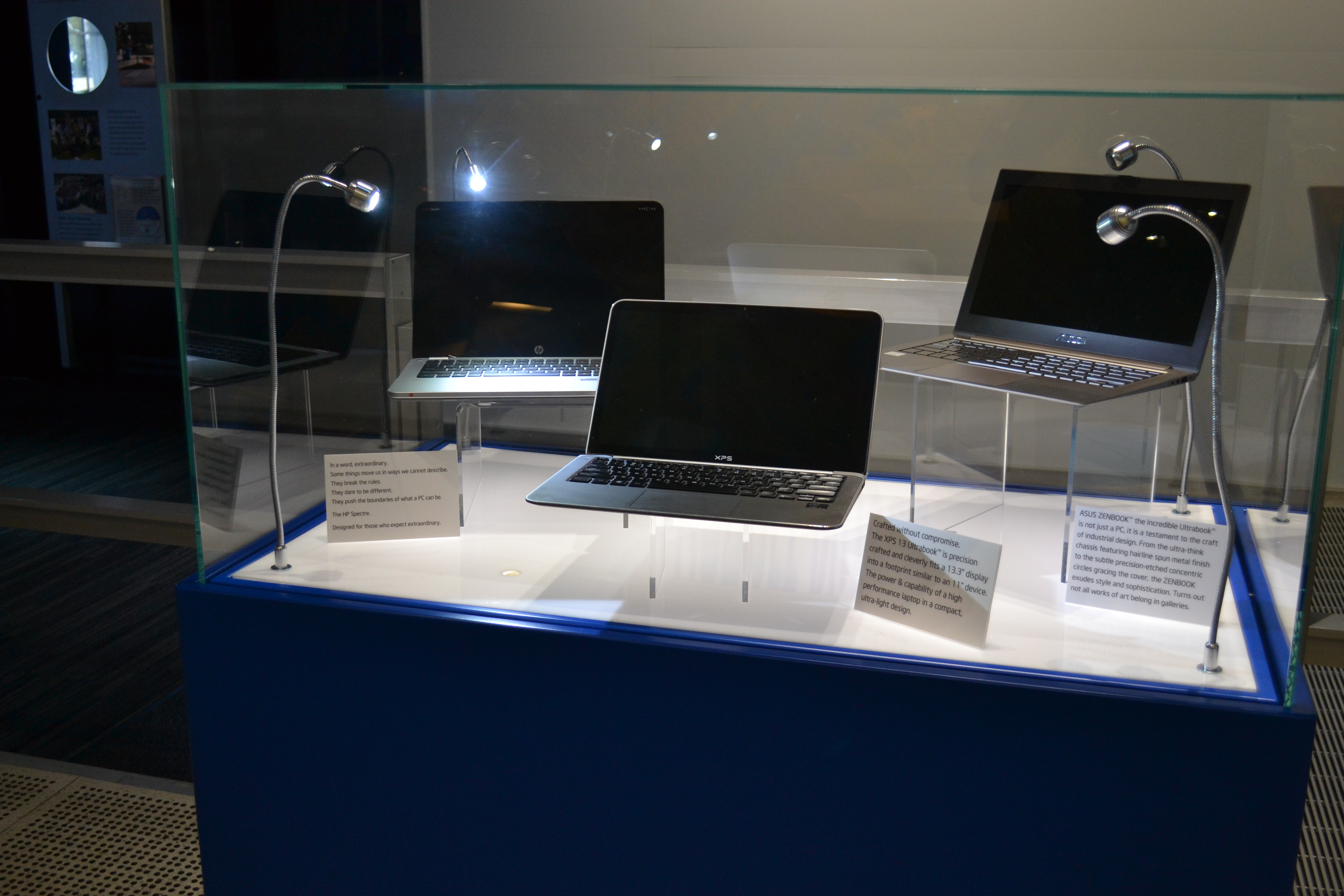
Ultrabooks

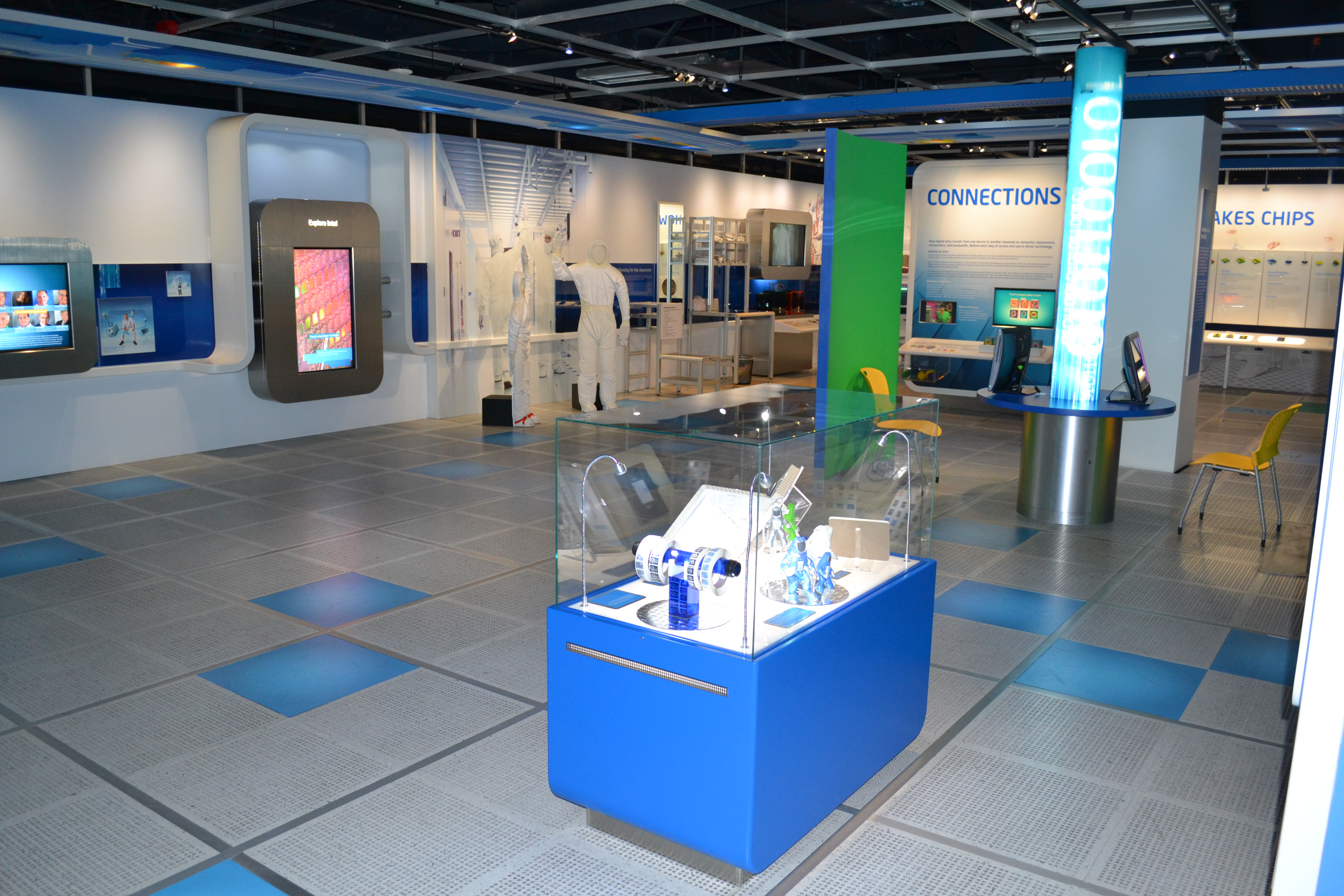
Another view of the museum
