= I-Cybie =

Robotic toy dog

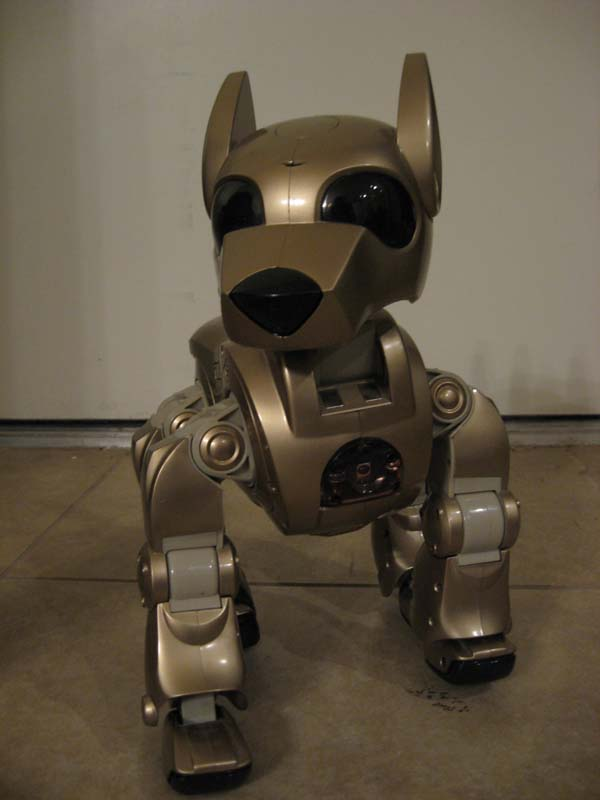
The i-Cybie.

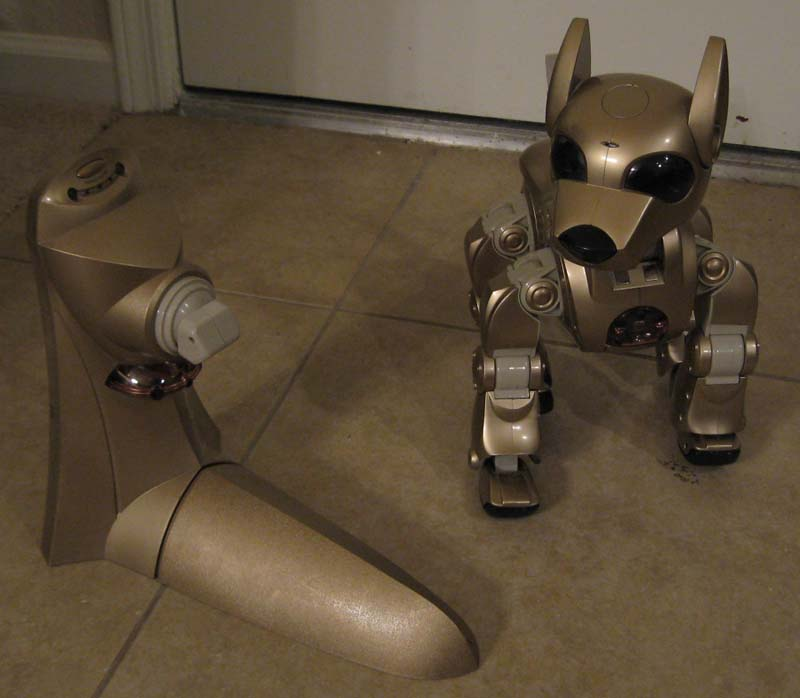
i-Cybie with walk up charger.

i-Cybie (爱赛比) is a robotic pet that resembles a dog. It was manufactured by Silverlit Toys Manufactory Ltd Hong Kong from 2000 to 2006. i-Cybie was developed for commercial distribution by Tiger Electronics. Outrageous International Hong Kong distributed the electronic pet from 2005 to 2006. The i-Cybie robotic dog responds to sound, touch, movement, and voice commands. The toy robot can autonomously recharge its batteries using a special docking station. I-Cybie was the first mass-produced toy that used advanced voice recognition technology.

== Features ==
i-Cybie has 16 built-in motors which allow 16 degrees of freedom. There are three CPU’s—the main Toshiba TMP91C815F for motion control and for mood calculation, a SunPlus Technology CPU used for audio playback, and an RSC 364 used for voice recognition and recording. i-Cybie is constructed using 1400 parts, and more than 90 feet of wire. The robot uses a suite of sensors to determine mood and behavior.

- Dimensions
  - Height: 11 inches (28 cm)
  - Width: 8 inches (20 cm)
  - Length: 12 inches (30 cm)
  - Weight: about 4 pounds (1.8 kg)
- Light Sensor (nose)— for motion detection in "guard" mode.
- Infrared Obstacle Detector (chest array)—for collision avoidance and edge detection. The chest array is also used to communicate with other toys (robo-chi, i-Cybie) and for receiving remote commands.
- Touch Sensors (back button, head button, nose button)— influence the i-Cybie's moods and behavior.
- Microphones (4)—three microphones are used to hear sharp sounds and one is used to discriminate voice. The robot can localize the direction of a sharp sound and move towards it. I-Cybies can recognize spoken commands and respond in a specific manner. Voice recognition features biometric authentication. Voice recognition is activated by the head contact sensor or by the remote control unit.
- Orientation Sensor—the robot can detect whether it has fallen over. The orientation sensor also contributes to the robot's mood.
- Encoders (12)- three per leg, position legs.
- Dynamic Drive feedback-it can sense when its limbs are jammed and take action to free itself.
- Light Sensor (back)— for use in mood and behavior calculations. The light sensor can also detect petting and can initiate behavior.

== Basic Functions ==
i-Cybies can be programmed to respond to the voice commands of a specific user. Voice control is a form of speech recognition that is "speaker dependent". The RSC 300/364 microcontroller can process commands in any spoken language and features biometric authentication. There are 8 voice commands listed in the manual allowing the user to initiate 8 different behavior categories. In addition to voice, i-Cybies can hear sharp sounds and localize the general direction of the source. It can also count the number of hand claps given in clap command mode (play mode) and respond with the same number of barks. i-Cybie can also detected when it has fallen over and automatically stand back up. It has the ability to detect when it is in a confined space or if it has become snagged against an obstacle. i-Cybie can "see" movement when in guard mode (motion detection) using a light sensor in its nose and it can also detect ambient light levels and movement using a light sensor in its back. i-Cybie uses several gaits for walking and among its numerous actions it can sit, roll on its side, and stand on its head. Other features include edge detection (a special mode) and collision avoidance. i-Cybie can detect its battery charge and will shut down when battery power is low or if equipped with a Walk Up Charger and programmable cartridge it will automatically seek out its charger and recharge itself.

i-Cybie uses five states or "moods" to determine autonomous behavior: happy, sad, sleepy, sick, and hyper. Moods are calculated based upon the cumulative count of interactions derived from the sensors. Users can tell the current mood/state by eye color, posture and type of behavior (i.e. yawning when sleepy or peeing when sick). I-Cybie is advertised as developing or evolving according to the environment and user treatment.

i-Cybie accepts signals from an infrared remote control unit (RCU) and was designed to “communicate” with Silverlit's robo-chi toys by transmitting and receiving IR signals using its chest array. There are several modes that are specific to the remote including play, stay, and guard mode. The remote is also used for "training" the robotic toy's voice recognition feature and for setting the pause mode.

== Cartridge ==
I-Cybies were originally sold with a "dummy" cartridge inserted in a programming port on the robot's right side. A fully programmable cartridge was included with the Silverlit Downloader and Walk Up Charger accessories which were sold separately (they were later bundled with the robot). The cartridge adds specific actions for navigation to the Walk Up Charger and a special charger approach routine. It can also be programmed with the Silverlit Downloader accessory to expand the robot's autonomous behavior with actions that are not part of i-Cybie's standard suite. With a programmable cartridge inserted i-Cybie can sense its battery charge and if it is low, the robot will autonomously locate its charger and dock. After charging the i-Cybie will back away from the charger and resume autonomous operation. Tiger Electronics programmable cartridges were populated with two 1 Mbit SST39vf010 chips with a total capacity of 256KB of flash ROM. The cartridge stores extra motion data and can be used to store additional audio files. (Late cartridges are populated with a single 2 Mbit SST39vf200 chip which will not program successfully in a standard Super iCybie). Late single chip carts can now be programmed by an updated SIC. A new CROMINST is available in the downloads of www.icybie.net16.net, which can be used to create a SIC which can program single chip carts, but the SIC MUST be an older style, dual-chip dog, as making a SIC from a single chip dog is as yet untested. In addition, a new walkup cart firmware was identified, indicating the newer single chip dogs may have a different firmware to the older i-cybie.

== Custom personalities ==
Although i-Cybies were designed to be programmed to individual tastes, Silverlit and Hasbro (Tiger Electronics' parent company) provided little support for development of this feature beyond the release of the Downloader and associated Downloader software. Faced with this deficit, users developed their own tools for modifying the robot's behavior. A group of dedicated modders and hackers provided unofficial support for i-Cybie during its early years on the market. The result was that a number of software and hardware tools were created to allow users to manipulate i-Cybie's behavior.

YICT (Yanni Idolizes iCybie Tweeking) is a program based on the reverse-engineering efforts of a robot enthusiast known as "Aibopet" and is one of the user-developed tools designed to program a cartridge using either a Silverlit Downloader or a Super-i-Cybie. An exploration of the functions allowed in YICT has revealed details about i-Cybie's programming logic and action categories that are not part of the general documentation. YICT also allows users to add more actions to each mood and change the overall behavior. The YICT version 2.02 software contains a number of personalities for users to build upon (example: the Z/2 personality) and is a major source for early user group developed personalities.

== Super-I-Cybie ==
It is possible to hack Tiger/Silverlit model i-Cybies and make them capable of writing directly to a programmable cartridge without the use of the downloader. This modified i-Cybie is called a "Super" i-Cybie (SIC) by its creator Aibopet. In general, the hack involves soldering a communications port to traces near the main CPU and installing a boot loader (CROMINST) that has been pre-loaded on a programmable cartridge. The one time process makes it possible for the robot to be programmed with a new personality and to serve as a programmer (downloader) for other i-Cybies. Users have noted that the Outrageous International i-Cybie cannot be hacked in this manner. A Super i-Cybie can also be completely reprogrammed in C language "from the ground up" with a user developed software development kit (ICSDK) to create new firmware.

== Firmware and hardware ==
The i-Cybie firmware was designed by Micom tech HK on behalf of Tiger. Research by i-Cybie Fans has determined that Hasbro owns the firmware rights, having acquired Tiger. There appear to be three models of i-Cybie; 88011 (Tiger/Silverlit), 88012 (Silverlit) and 88013 (Outrageous/Silverlit). Each model displays minor differences in component arrangement and structural detail and there are several circuit board versions for each model. It is not generally known whether there is a noticeable difference in firmware between models based on these differences.

== History ==
The Hong Kong based Toy Company Silverlit built the prototype i-Cybie and presented it at the 1999 American International Toy Fair in New York City. The early prototypes looked very similar to Sony’s ERS-110 in appearance but were meant to compete at a significantly lower consumer price. Tiger Electronics acquired the rights to distribute i-Cybie in 2000 and spent more than 2 million dollars to further develop the robot. Tiger subsequently redesigned the prototype i-Cybie to make it look more like a dog and less like the AIBO ERS 110. A team of programmers led by Andy Filo reprogrammed i-Cybie to walk, interact, and to exhibit lifelike characteristics. The electronic pet was first released in January 2001.

Originally i-Cybies were sold with a plug-in charger, a remote, a rechargeable 12 volt nickel metal cadmium battery and a “dummy” cartridge. In 2002 the Walk Up Charger and the Downloader, each sold with a programmable cartridge, were released as accessories. Daniel Kehoe optested the pilot voice recognition software prior to that year’s holiday season, and approved for mass distribution. The robotic toy was offered in two colors; metallic blue and metallic gold. In 2002 new shell options were offered including black, white, and transparent. The price point for i-Cybie was set at US$200, significantly less than the price for its chief robotic competitor at the time, the Sony AIBO ERS 111, then priced at more than US$1500. The i-Cybie robotic pet was set to be on the shelves in December 2000 in time for the seasonal increase in consumer spending. However, difficulties in development caused Tiger Electronics to postpone the initial release to early 2001. Soon after its debut consumers reported that an "error" in the original quick start manual instructed owners to charge the batteries ten hours. The time was not consistent with the recommended charge time for the charger (300ma) and the battery (800mah) released with the robot. The reported error allegedly resulted in some batteries being overcharged by users and rendered useless. Negative customer reviews may have effected some sales. Silverlit appears to have addressed this issue with the release of a "smart" battery charger accessory by 2002 and a higher capacity nickel metal hydride battery. Tiger Electronics discontinued support for i-Cybie soon after its release due to poor sales. Silverlit continued to support the robot and released new shell options, a Walk-Up Charger and Downloader as promised upgrades.

In 2004, a small California-based online store named Buy-Cybie.com (also later under the name Buy-Robot) distributed newly-manufactured i-Cybie dogs with minor improvements; namely including the Z-Cybie personality cartridge. i-Cybie dogs from this production run are nearly identical, the only notable differences being the lack of Tiger or Hasbro logos on the shipping box (replaced with only Silverlit logos) and a manual that no longer informs the user to charge the battery for 10 hours.

Outrageous International Hong Kong relaunched i-Cybie in 2005 with the promise of improved features and a rumor circulated among i-Cybie fan sites of a new furry "x-Cybie" shell option for 2006. Although some Outrageous i-Cybies were made, only a few were released with fur (flock) covering. In 2006 the product was listed as discontinued in Western markets but some Chinese websites still list new i-Cybie's available for sale in China. As of Spring 2014, Silverlit still offered support for the robot and carried the Walk Up Charger, Downloader and other accessories for i-Cybie at their international 3deshop website.

Throughout its production run i-Cybies were compared to Sony's Aibo entertainment robots. Although both devices share many features, in general AIBOs are more mechanically complex and they have a more powerful and versatile CPU. The AIBO series also use a vision system that is capable of tracking color and they possess a comparatively large suite of behavior that takes advantage of their vision abilities. Beyond its infrared collision avoidance, the i-Cybie does not have a vision system and its behavioral suite is comparatively limited. However, the i-Cybie pioneered features found in later robotic pets such as speech recognition and autonomous recharging.

Soon after i-Cybie's release a small user group community developed with the intent of enhancing i-Cybie's features. Although some success was made in creating tools to manipulate the toy robot's software, lack of official support and development led the community to eventually disband.

== Education ==
Because of the low cost versus technological capabilities, i-Cybies have been used by universities to teach programming and robotics. Notable examples include the work of France Cadet, an artist and Associate Professor & Chair (Art & Technology department) at the School of the Art Institute of Chicago. Known for her robotic and bio-oriented multi-media installations, Cadet has featured i-Cybies in many of her art exhibits worldwide. Natalie Jeremijenko's Feral Dogs Project teaches students ecology at the University of California San Diego using i-Cybies modified with pollution sensors to seek out chemicals. Recently (prior to 2010) inventor Andy Filo was interviewed and commented "[i-Cybie] is still probably one of the most complex toys that was ever sold on the toy isle".

== See also ==
- Aibo, is an iconic series of robotic pets designed and manufactured by Sony.
- Genibo, is a robotic dog produced by Dasarobot of Dasatech.
- Musio is a social robot with friend and pet-like characteristics.
- Pleo, is an animatronic pet dinosaur toy designed Ugobe
