= Poo-Chi =

2000s robotic dog toy

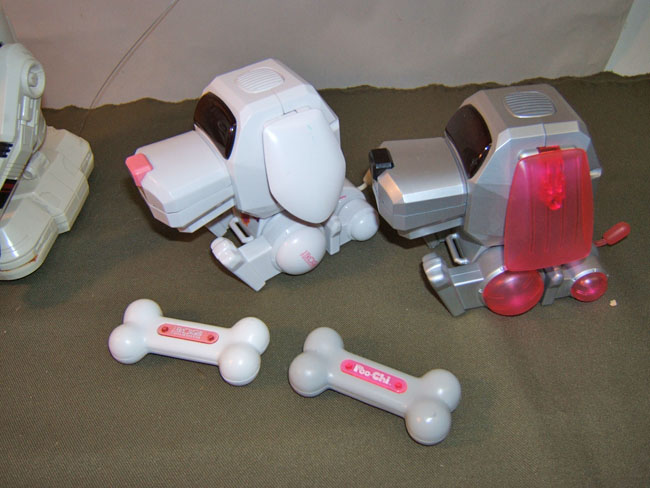
- Two Poo-Chi toys
- Manufacturer: Sega Toys
- Inventor: Samuel James Lloyd; Matt Lucas
- Country: United States
- Year of creation: April 1, 2000; 26 years ago
- Price: 3,980 yen (Japan) $24.99 (United States)
- Type: Robot dog

Poo-Chi (also Poochi or Poochie), one of the first generations of robopet toys, is a robot dog designed by Samuel James Lloyd and Matt Lucas, manufactured by Sega Toys, and distributed by Tiger Electronics. Poo-Chi was released in 2000 and discontinued in 2002.

== History ==
Sega Toys' Poo-Chi hit markets on 1 April 2000, with Hasbro's Tiger Electronics distributing the toy in all countries other than Japan and Korea, both of which had the toy distributed directly from Sega Toys instead. Retailing at a price of 3,980 yen (then the equivalent of US$38) in Japan and $24.99 in the United States. Despite being made for a young child owner instead of older children 8 and up like AIBO, Poo-Chi offered significantly cheaper competition to the AIBO's prices of up to 250,000 yen (then US$2,400). At the time, Hasbro's sales in their leading Furby line were slowing since its initial release in 1998 and sales of Star Wars branded merchandise was in decline. The Poo-Chi's release was a success, selling over 10 million units worldwide over the span of 8 months since its initial debut.

Special editions of the Poo-Chi soon sprouted, such as the 102 Dalmatians holiday release of three Poo-Chis resembling the characters Domino, Little Dipper, and Oddball. In addition to special editions, an upgraded version, the Super Poo-Chi, and differing breeds of the Poo-Chi were released (all of which could communicate together), along with spin-offs such as the Meow-Chi and the Chirpy-Chi. Miniature versions were featured as toys in the McDonald's Happy Meal.

Poo-Chi stopped selling in 2002, having been replaced by FurReal Friends.

In 2011, Sega Toys released a new incarnation of Poo-Chi to go alongside the game Wappy Dog.

== Description ==
The original Poo-Chi had a gray body with ears, tail, and leg joints of either purple, blue, pink or green colour. With four legs allowing the toy to stand up or lie down, it utilized a red LED display as eyes to show emotion. The toy could additionally respond to voice commands.

=== Special Editions ===
The Christmas Special Edition Poo-Chi was offered for a limited time, coloured in red and white with snowflake designs throughout the body, ears, with an interactive bone included in its seasonal box. The toy had its list of songs updated to include Christmas music. The Christmas Special Edition was only available in a handful of countries and retailed for 2–3 months, making it the rarest and most collectible of the genre with collectors. There are two known variations of the Christmas ones, 1 version sings the 6 songs that standard non-special edition Poo-Chis play, while the other version plays Christmas songs. There were also two known Japanese Christmas versions being slightly different color from one another and coming with a Christmas hat and scarf.

=== Speech ===
Poo-Chi spoke using prerecorded sounds such as barks, whines, and growls. Due to limitations of the toy's technology, most of the sounds were rendered as beeps rather than a realistic sound effect. Poo-Chi could also "bark" songs, which could be prompted by pressing the button on the top of its head.

=== Spin-offs ===
Multiple spin-offs of the Poo-Chi were produced. All were based on different animals, other than the Super Poo-Chi, a larger version of the original toy.

- Meow-Chi - a robotic cat.
- Super Poo-Chi - a larger version of the original toy.
- Dino-Chi - a robotic dinosaur, with two types produced: the Dino-Chi T. Rex and the Dino-Chi Pterodactyl.
- Chirpy-Chi - a robotic bird.
- Petal-Chi - a robotic flower or plant.
- Robo-Baby - a robotic baby.
- Botster - a regular robot.
- Walking Poo-Chi - a walking version of the Poo-Chi.

=== Songs ===
The Poo-Chi could "sing" one of 6 songs when following the light sensor in its nose being activated, the touch sensor on its head was pressed. The toy would then emit a series of high-pitched beeps. The user could afterwards press the touch sensor, the number of times the sensor having been pressed corresponding to a different tune. The different songs the Poo-Chi could play are as follows:

Number of sensor presses	Song title
1	"The Wedding March"
2	"Camptown Races"
3	"Bingo"
4	"I've Been Working on the Railroad" / "Home on the Range"
5	"Symphony No. 9"
6	"When the Saints Come Marching In"

Poo-Chi would often sing "Ode to Joy" by Ludwig van Beethoven when happy, and if another Poo-Chi or Robo-Chi pet was nearby (such as a Meow-Chi), that other Robo-Chi would begin to sing "Ode to Joy" as well, though the playback would not be synchronized.
