= Smart toy =

Artificially intelligent toy

A smart toy is an interactive artificially intelligent toy which effectively has its own intelligence by virtue of on-board electronics. These enable it to learn, behave according to preset patterns, and alter its actions depending upon environmental stimuli and user input. Typically, it can adjust to the abilities of the player. A modern smart toy has electronics consisting of one or more microprocessors or microcontrollers, volatile and/or non-volatile memory, storage devices, and various forms of input–output devices. It may be networked together with other smart toys or a personal computer in order to enhance its play value or educational features. Generally, the smart toy may be controlled by software which is embedded in firmware or else loaded from an input device such as a USB flash drive, Memory Stick or CD-ROM. Smart toys frequently have extensive multimedia capabilities, and these can be utilized to produce a realistic, animated, simulated personality for the toy. Some commercial examples of smart toys are Amazing Amanda, Furby and iDog. The first smart-toy was the Mego Corporation's 2-XL robot (2XL), invented in the 1970s

== Common confusions ==
In the 1978 75th Anniversary Cover story of Playthings Magazine, showed the demarcation between toys that kids played with, and the advent of smart-toy, that could play back.

Smart toys are frequently confused with toys for which it is claimed that children who play with them become smarter. Examples are educational toys that may or may not provide on-board intelligence features. A toy which merely contains a media player for telling the child a story should not be classified as a smart toy even if the player contains its own microprocessor. What best distinguishes a smart toy is the way the on-board intelligence is holistically integrated into the play experience in order to create simulated human-like intelligence or its facsimile.

== History ==
Smart toys have their early roots in clockworks such as those of the eighteenth and nineteenth century cuckoo clocks, music boxes of the nineteenth, and Disney audio-animatronics of the twentieth. Perhaps the biggest early contribution is from novelty and toy makers from the 1800s who made automatons such as Vaucanson's mechanical duck, von Kempelen's The Turk, and the Silver Swan. All pre-twentieth-century precursors had in common that they were mechanical contrivances. By the second half of the 1900s toys featuring built-in media players became common. For example, Mattel introduced a variety of dolls in the 1960s and 1970s that used a pull string activated talking device to make the dolls "talk" such as the talking Crissy doll and Chatty Cathy.

However, it remained until the introduction of the microprocessor in the mid-1970s for smart toys to come into their own. Texas Instrument's Speak & Spell which came on the market in the late 1970s was one of the first full-featured smart toys. The device is similar to a very limited laptop with LED read-out. It is used for spelling games and guessing a "mystery code". It speaks and makes a variety of sound effects. Another early example is Teddy Ruxpin, a robotic teddy bear, which came out in the 1980s. It reads children's stories via a recording device built into its back and swivels its eyes and mouth.

Even the earliest toys, from the nineteenth century on, have in common with their modern-day smart toy counterparts that they appear to be sentient and lifelike, at least to the extent possible using the technology available at the time. Contemporary smart toys utilize speech recognition and activation; that is, they appear to comprehend and react to words that are spoken. Through speech synthesis, smart toys speak prerecorded words and phrases. These kinds of technologies, when combined together, animate the toys and give them a lifelike persona.

Another hardware feature of modern smart toys is sensors which enable the smart toy to be aware of what is going on in its environment. These permit the toy to tell its orientation, determine if it is being played with indoors or outdoors, and know who is playing with it based upon the strength of the squeeze the child's hand gives it or similar factors. A typical example is Lego Mindstorms, a series of robotic-like devices, which integrate LEGO pieces with sensors and accessories. These toys include microcontrollers which control the robots. They are pre-programmed by a personal computer and utilize light and touch sensors along with accelerometers. Accelerometers and temperature, pressure and humidity sensors, can also be used to create various effects by smart toy designers.

The development of smart toys received a major boost in 1998 when semiconductor manufacturer, Intel, and toy maker, Mattel, Inc. entered into a joint venture to open a Smart Toy Lab in Portland, Oregon. This led to products that were marketed under the Intel Play brand. The first product in the line was the QX3 Computer Microscope. The Lab evolved into a toy company known today as Digital Blue, a division of Prime Entertainment, Inc. of Marietta, GA.

== Controversies ==
Widespread commercialization of smart toys is mainly a 21st-century phenomenon. As they have gained acceptance in the marketplace, controversy has been brewing. One of the chief criticisms has been that despite often being technical marvels, many smart toys have only limited play value. In short, these toys neither involve the child in play activity nor do they stimulate the imagination. Consequently, regardless of store-shelf attractiveness, the child tires quickly of them after only one or two play sessions, and the parents' investment is largely wasted. Stevanne Auerbach, in her book Smart Play—Smart Toys introduces the notion of Play Quotient or simply PQ.

Auerbach criticizes smart toys for often having low PQs. PQ is a rating system based upon a weighted average constructed from a comprehensive list of play value attributes. Playthings with higher PQs are desirable from the standpoint of stimulating the child's imagination, creativity, and inquisitiveness. Generally, children choose to play with these products over and over again. Those toys with low PQs are quickly set aside. The child finds them boring and uninteresting.

Many child development experts prefer open-ended toys such as construction toys, blocks, dolls, etc. over smart toys. For example, a cardboard box that the child turns into a pretend play house will be played with continuously by the child for many hours whereas an expensive smart toy can quickly exhaust the child's interest once its novelty has worn off.

Jillian Trezise typifies the attitude often taken by child development specialists and educators towards smart toys, "...if kids can't take their expensive toys to the sandpit or open them up to see how they work, then they don't provide much educational value. All they do is entertain and they don't hold young people's attention for very long."

Another implicit concern about smart toys is that even when they hold the child's attention they could become so entertaining that parents may be tempted to turn over some of the child-rearing to the smart toys. Thus, children will be deprived of needed parental attention. In other words, because of their strong multimedia capabilities children may watch presentations provided by the smart toys and be entertained, but will not really play with the devices nor be otherwise engaged by them.

Judy Shackelford, a toy industry veteran, has a more positive view regarding smart toys. She cautions that children may even be deprived should they be not exposed to them. She sees smart toys as part of the surrounding environment that children will need to adapt to as they mature. Should they not be given access to these kinds of toys, they may become less well adapted to thrive and benefit as technology evolves.

Smart toy advocates also point to research indicating that children learn more effectively with good interactive software. This seems to support the idea that smart toys may have many educational benefits as well.

There have been increasing concerns that smart toys, especially ones that directly connect to the Internet, are becoming easy targets for cybercriminals, who can use hacking to easily obtain personal data collected from a smart toy, especially personal names. For example, smart toys such as Niantic's Pokémon Go collects the user's geo-locations and Mattel's Hello Barbie collects audio recordings.

== Industry ==
Market research company GfK Australia found that parents are spending record amounts on electronic and interactive toys.

Mark Allen states that the greatest impediment to the further growth of the smart toy industry is the lack of development of artificial intelligence and speech recognition. At their present stage of evolution smart toys really can't learn so they are limited to predefined actions and speech. Present artificial intelligence capabilities are too expensive to implement in a toy, but this will change as computational power and speed come down in price. Eventually, this will result in cheaper technology, enhanced functionality, and a richer play experience. Some toy designers think it could be five years or more before the technology is cheap enough to be widely available.

Others have cited the high cost of MEMS-based sensors and actuators as a factor constraining the rapid development of smart toys. These costs are expected to come down eventually also, thereby helping toy companies to hit their price targets.

According to figures from the NPD Group, at the end of 1999, the smart toy segment made up 2.5 percent of the $23 billion toy market.

The smart toy industry grew out of several other product categories, which include children's software, electronic toys, and video games. A 2001 Forrester Research study projected that the smart toy segment would grow to more than $2 billion by the year 2003. Factors enhancing the growth of the smart toy segment include the greatly more sophisticated tastes of children today as well as the spread of home PCs.

A 2005 market research study by Tangull America LLC of New York, NY indicated that toys with embedded information technologies—that is, nano, bio and cognitive technologies—are growing over 15% annually, and will grow to sales of US $146 billion by 2015. As an example, one of the "smart toys" the study cites are "interactive puppets" that become "real playmates" through the combination of artificial intelligence and ultrafine sensors. The latter can measure changes in facial expressions, movements, and environment and the puppets react accordingly.

== Selection criteria ==
The issue of balance is often mentioned in connection with smart toys—namely, that their use should be kept in proportion with other play activities. They should also be age appropriate and not become a substitute for interaction with parents. Playing with smart toys should be a supplement, not a replacement, for traditional play activities.

Stevanne Auerbach emphasizes smart toys which have strong play value for the child, and are the "right toy at the right time." She does not favor those toys which fail to encourage discovery and exploration. Auerbach quips that "a toy playing with a child, as opposed to a child playing with a toy, is not beneficial for the child.

Those toys that give the child control over interaction are best according to some child development researchers. Kiely Gouley argues that "...some of these toys are very entertaining and they make the child a passive observer." She continues: "...you want the child to engage with the world. If the toy does everything if it sings and beeps and shows pictures, what does the child have to do?"

Smart toys should have very clean, easy-to-understand and navigate user interfaces. Claire Lerner, a child-development specialist, says that pretend play can be inhibited by highly structured toys: "They superimpose someone else's story on the kids. So kids don't develop their imaginations." In her view, simpler toys are preferable, because they are more flexible.

Children by nature are unpredictable and often fail to follow the same rules followed by adults. One of the tasks of the designer is to anticipate ways that interaction with children can fail to be as expected and to guide the user into one of the expected responses. This can be achieved by giving the child options to select and other types of cues to follow.

For parents and child development specialists alike, the task remains to select the right toys at the right time. However, from the toy designer's standpoint, the challenge is to identify the best technologies at a feasible cost, and then to develop products around those capabilities and limitations of the technologies used in smart toys.

Anthropologist David Lancy argues that parent-child play is largely an artifact of wealthy developed countries not practiced by most of the world's population. It results from competitive pressures to ready children for survival in an information-based economy. He views the promotion of interaction between parents and children in "play activities" as a form of cultural imperialism practiced by the upper and upper middle class upon lower income socioeconomic strata. This is possibly one reservation on a completely unrestricted view that parents should always be involved in selecting appropriate smart toys for their children.

== In popular culture ==
Smart toys are a relatively new but growing theme in popular culture, most notably (but not always) in the horror fiction genre. Notable examples include the Black Mirror episode "Rachel, Jack and Ashley Too", which features a smart toy modelled after a famous fictional pop idol, the 2022 film M3GAN, which features a smart toy resembling a little girl designed as a "friend" for real children, the 2024 TV series Sunny, which features a domestic assistance robot (homebot), the 1998 film Small Soldiers, in which fictitious company Globotech Industries uses a smart chip to give their toys personality and a life of their own, and 51N3RG.Y (pronounced "Synergy"), a small benevolent robot appearing in Jem and the Holograms. While earlier films from the 2000s explored the idea of artificial intelligence used to mimic life, such as AIA in Afraid and Edgar in Electric Dreams, the Red and White Queens in the Resident Evil film series or "Simone" (S1M0NE) in Simone, the exploration of such technology in the realm of smart toys is still a growing and fairly recent territory in fiction.

== See also ==
- AI toy
- Artificial human companion
- Companion robot
- Connected toys
- M3GAN
- Rachel, Jack and Ashley Too
- Robotic pet
- Social robot
- Toys-to-life
