= Hajime Sorayama =

Japanese illustrator (born 1947)

- 空山基
- Born: 22 February 1947 (age 79); Imabari, Ehime Prefecture, Japan
- Education: Chuo Art School
- Known for: Erotic illustration
- Website: sorayama.net

Hajime Sorayama (空山 基, Sorayama Hajime; born February 22, 1947) is a Japanese illustrator known, along for his design work on the original Sony AIBO, for his precisely detailed, erotic portrayals of feminine robots. He describes his highly detailed style as "superrealism", which he says "deals with the technical issue of how close one can get to one's object."

== Early life ==
Hajime Sorayama was born in 1947 in Imabari, Ehime prefecture, Japan. He received his basic education at Imabari Kita High School where he began drawing Playboy inspired pin-ups. He was influenced by Makoto Oda's book Nandemo Mite yaro ("I'll go and see everything") about his travels through Europe and Asia; Sorayama took interest in Greece and decided to enter Christian Shikoku Gakuin University to study English literature and Ancient Greek. In his second year, he founded the school magazine, Pink Journal, but criticism motivated him to leave for Tokyo's Chuo Art School in 1967 to study art.

Sorayama graduated in 1968 at the age of 21, and gained an appointment in an advertising agency. He became a freelance illustrator in 1972. In 1978, he drew his first robot. Of this subject, he wrote: "A friend of mine, the designer Hara Koichi, wanted to use C-3PO from Star Wars for a Suntory poster presentation. But time was short and there were problems with copyright fee[s], so I was asked to come up with something."

== Career ==
Sorayama is known for his fine art, illustration, and industrial design. Of the distinction between the first two, Soryama commented in an interview: "Unlike art, illustration is not a matter of emotion or hatreds, but an experience that comes naturally through logical thinking."

Sorayama began drawing erotic art of gynoid robots in 1983. His pin-up work appeared monthly for years in the pages of Penthouse magazine, and Playboy TV later aired made a television special on Sorayama's art. In an interview, he said pin-up was his "mania", commenting that "I've been drawing them since high school. Back then, there was this thing for the Playboy and Penthouse playmates. Now, it's the girl-next-door, idol type, but in our day, these pin-ups were like goddesses. I guess I could describe it as my own goddess cult."

His style has influenced other works such as the 2015 film Ex Machina.

In the 2000s, Sorayama's first-generation AIBO design (the robotics of which were developed by Sony's Toshitada Doi) received the Grand Prize of Best Design award, the highest design award conferred by Japan. AIBO has since been included in the permanent collections of the Museum of Modern Art (MOMA) and the Smithsonian Institution. It was included in the book Objects of Design by Paola Antonelli and has been the subject of special studies at Carnegie Mellon University. The Nike "White Dunk Project" included Sorayama among the 25 most inspiring Japanese artists.

The artist released another retrospective, Master Works, in early 2010, and a new book, Vibrant Vixens, in May 2013 and updated version "XL Masterworks" in 2014. He worked with filmmakers in Hollywood on fantasy and science fiction projects, including a film about Penthouse. During 2012 and 2013, Sorayama collaborated with American fashion designer Marc Ecko. In 2013 Sorayama was a contributor to the art book Star Wars Art Concept.

In 2016, South Korean fashion label Juun.J released a series of garments in collaboration with Sorayama. French fashion brand Dior collaborated with Sorayama for their Pre-Fall 2019 menswear collection. The collection was a commercial and critical hit, and Sorayama worked with Dior on a follow-up Summer capsule collection.

In 2025, AIBO was included in MoMA's Pirouette: Turning Points in Design, an exhibition featuring "widely recognized design icons [...] highlighting pivotal moments in design history."

== Bibliography ==
- Pink Journal (1967)
- Sexy Robot (1983, Genko-sha)
- Pin-up (1984, Graphic-sha)
- Venus Odyssey (1985, Ed. Tokuma communications)
- Hajime Sorayama (1989, Taco, Berlín)
- Sorayama Hyper Illustrations (1 & 2) (1989, Bijutsu Shuppan-sha)
- The Gynoids (1993, Edition Treville)
- Naga (1997, Sakuhin-sha)
- Torquere (1998, Sakuhin-sha)
- Sorayama 1964–99. The Complete Works (1999, Sakuhin-sha)
- The Gynoids genetically manipulated (2000, Edition Treville)
- Gynoids reborn (2000, Edition Treville)
- Sorayamart (2000, Ed. Soleil)
- Moira (2000, Edition Kunst der Comics)
- Metallicon (2001, Sakuhin-sha)
- The Gynoids. The Storage Box (2002, Edition Treville)
- Venom (2002, Graphic-sha)
- Latex Galatea (2003, Editions Treville)
- Relativision (2006)
- "Sorayama's Master Works", (late spring 2010 release)
- "Vibrant Vixens", (late spring 2013 release)
- "XL Masterworks", (2014 release)
