= Bratz: Rock Angelz =

2005 video game

- North American GameCube box art
- Developer: Blitz Games (Note: Altron developed the Game Boy Advance version and AWE Games developed the Windows version.)
- Publisher: THQ
- Designers: Paul Jennings; Andrew Fletcher
- Programmers: Chris Allen; Christopher Fry; Robert Grant; Matthew Hayward; Tim Page
- Artists: Brian Hartley; Auburn Hodgson; Sebastian Livall; Robert Price; Bryn Williams
- Writers: Chris Bateman; Richard Boon; Adria Smiley
- Engine: RenderWare
- Platforms: Game Boy Advance; GameCube; PlayStation 2; Windows
- Release: NA: October 4, 2005; PAL: October 14, 2005
- Genre: Adventure
- Mode: Single-player

Bratz: Rock Angelz is a 2005 adventure video game based on the Bratz fashion doll line and published by THQ. It is based on the direct-to-video film Bratz: Rock Angelz and the line of dolls affiliated with the same name. The game was released for the PlayStation 2, GameCube, Game Boy Advance, and Windows. Blitz Games developed the PlayStation 2 and GameCube versions, while Altron and AWE Games developed the Game Boy Advance and Windows versions respectively.

The game loosely follows the film's plot, where the Bratz start a fashion magazine. They later receive an invitation from a nightclub in London to perform at a concert venue and outsell their rival competitor, Your Thing magazine. However, unlike the film, the Bratz travel to areas other than London. The gameplay primarily revolves around participating in tasks for the magazine, as well as performing fashion shows. It also features a variety of minigames that consist of posing, photography, and racing. Players can also dress the Bratz girls in various fashion lines and apply makeup to their faces.

Upon release, reviews of Bratz: Rock Angelz were generally mixed. Some critics praised the game for its open world, minigames, and creative features. However, many others criticized it for its sole appeal to a young female demographic. The game sold 1.5 million copies upon its release. It also received three sequels, which are titled Bratz: Forever Diamondz (2006), Bratz: The Movie (2007), and Bratz: Girlz Really Rock (2008).

== Gameplay ==
=== PlayStation 2 and GameCube ===
This version of the game is an open world adventure. The player controls one of the four Bratz girls (Yasmin, Cloe, Sasha, and Jade) who are attempting to launch their own teen magazine.

The player can explore 4 different locations; Stylesville (where the Bratz live), London, Paris, and the mansion. The objectives of the game are triggered when the player takes the correct Bratz girl to a speech bubble. During the game, coins called blings appear, which are coins for the Bratz girls. Each girl carries a cell phone, used to send messages between characters, check the amount of blings owned, and the location of the next objective. The phone's cover and ringtone can be changed. The player can also collect character token coins, used to buy movie clips. There are 25 available for each Bratz girl. The game also allows players to take pictures, and play minigames for extra money. The girls' make-up can be applied as the player wishes. The Bratz can be guided to shops, to buy the latest trends with their collected blings.

Minigames are activated by going to certain locations or talking to non-player characters. They include:

- Posing - The player must do the button combinations before the time runs out. In certain objectives, this minigame will be featured.
- Blown Away! - The player has to pick up pieces of paper that a person has dropped, and return them.
- Model Behavior! - The player has to take pictures in a photo booth.
- Rockin' Racerz - The player has to put on the Bratz girl's in-line roller skates, and grab the flags as fast as she can.

=== Game Boy Advance ===
The Game Boy Advance version uses the same story as the console version, but includes its own set of tasks. Progress is achieved by completing tasks in the home town of Stylesville. Halfway through the story, the girls travel to London, and prepare for a London show.

=== Windows ===
The Windows version of the game is different from the console version. This version is a point-and-click adventure game and follows the film's story more faithfully.

There are nine objectives of the game. The odd-numbered objectives (chapter 1, 3, 5, 7, 9) are reflex-like mini-games, where the player has to do the tasks to collect points. Each mini-game has four rounds. When the player takes or misses the part, the player will gain lower points. At three misses, the player has to do the round again losing a number of points. With points, the player can unlock fashions for the Bratz girls, except in the final objective.

The even-numbered objectives (chapter 2, 4, 6, 8) are puzzle-like adventure games. The player has to play with the certain Bratz character and take things to solve a puzzle (for example give a camera to a colleague). The player can take pictures on those objectives to print them on the "Secrets" menu. Each adventure objective, the player has to design an article, logo, flyer, or poster to complete the part of the objective. The player can even print their own design. This part can be accessed on the "Secrets" menu.

When the player has beaten the game, they'll unlock a card game, called Top Trumps, which is similar to war. The player gets a card each turn with number totals on it. The player has to guess which number on the card is higher than the opponent's card. If their correct, they win the card. They go on playing until all 28 cards are in one player's possession.

After Jade is rejected by Your Thing magazine the girls decide to make their own magazine to compete against Your Thing.

== Plot ==
Jade gets accepted as an intern for a famous fashion magazine named Your Thing, run by Burdine Maxwell. However, Burdine's other interns, Kirstee and Kaycee, who are nicknamed the "Tweevils" by the Bratz, devise a plan to get Jade fired. They later persuade Jade to give Burdine a cheeseburger, but once she gives it to her, Burdine becomes enraged and fires Jade, leading her to feel miserable. Afterwards, Jade meets her friends Cloe, Sasha, and Yasmin and informs them of the incident. They then devise a surprise party to console her. Jade starts feeling happier and more uplifted and creates an idea to start their own magazine together called "Bratz".

The Bratz find an office that also happens to be right next to Burdine's office headquarters. They remodel it and use it as their headquarters. After completing a few articles for the magazine, Jade receives an invitation from a nightclub in London called Pinz Nightclub to see the rock band Crash perform at its concert venue. When they complete the articles for their first issue, they discover their tickets to London have been stolen by the Tweevils. To retrieve them, one of the Bratz disguises herself as a Tweevil and sneaks into Burdine's office. They finally arrive in London afterwards and learn Crash has split up due to creative differences. This gives them the idea to start a rock band together in place of Crash. After they perform at Pinz Nightclub as "Rock Angelz", their magazine becomes a commercial success and outsells Your Thing magazine.

A fashion show venue in Paris asks the Bratz to headline their Ooh La La fashion show, and after completing the articles for their second issue, they arrive in Paris and discover the venue was acquired by a company called "Pink Industries". They then realize the company is related to Your Thing after the Tweevils arrive, so the Bratz spy on them to gather information on their decision to purchase the venue. When they approach them, they ask the Tweevils how they can obtain Burdine's permission to use the venue. The Tweevils give the Bratz a plan that revolves around blackmailing Burdine by taking a photo of her without her awareness. The Bratz decide to follow the plan by sneaking into a salon where Burdine is in the middle of a skincare regimen, with Yasmin being chosen to take the photo due to her flexibility. The Bratz subsequently inform Burdine they are aware of her schemes to discontinue their fashion show, causing Burdine to give them consent to use the venue. After coping with Burdine's conspiracy, the Bratz eventually perform their fashion show, and like their London venue, it was commercially successful, along with the magazine selling an abundance of copies.

Jade brings three mail letters to the Bratz office. The letters are revealed to be offers to their dream jobs. Cloe receives an offer as a journalist for a national magazine, Sasha receives an invitation from Pinz Nightclub as a highly professional disc jockey, and Yasmin gets accepted into a Paris beauty college. Jade, however, does not receive an offer. After completing the articles for their third issue, they receive another fashion show venue invitation to a mansion, where the Bratz promise will be their final fashion show. Following the performance, the Bratz girls except Jade pursue their dream jobs, causing Jade to feel left out.

The Tweevils later inform Jade that Cloe has become a journalist for Burdine. Cloe realizes Burdine deceived her into signing a contract. Jade immediately contacts both Yasmin and Sasha, who are both disappointed in the results of their dream jobs, leading both of them to arrive back home to confront Burdine and the Tweevils. However, after Burdine tells them the contract has already been signed, the pages of the contract fly out of the window, which leads to a race between Jade and Burdine to collect the pages. Jade collects all of the pages and defeats Burdine in the race. With Burdine feeling defeated, the Bratz celebrate their triumph by performing their final rock show at the mansion.

== Reception ==
Reception

Aggregate score
Aggregator	Score			
Aggregator	GBA	GameCube	PC	PS2
Metacritic	N/A	N/A	N/A	60/100

Review scores
Publication	Score			
Publication	GBA	GameCube	PC	PS2
GameZone	N/A	N/A	8 out of 10	N/A
Game Vortex	N/A	N/A	N/A	80 out of 100
Gaming Age	N/A	N/A	N/A	B
GotNext	N/A	1.5/5	N/A	N/A
NZGamer.com	N/A	N/A	N/A	7.3/10
DS-x2	N/A	N/A	N/A	7.5/10

Bratz: Rock Angelz received "mixed or average" reviews on the PlayStation 2 according to the review aggregation website Metacritic.

The game was moderately successful, selling 1.5 million copies upon its release.

Many reviews praised the game for its unique open world. Ivan Sulic of IGN described it as "well-developed and nicely presented". He also complimented the game's play value. Dustin Chadwell of Gaming Age gave the PlayStation 2 version a B and stated, "I definitely have to give a thumb up to the development team that worked on making what could have been simple license cash in into a playable, and enjoyable game." Angelina Sandoval of GameZone was very fond of the game's minigames and collection of fashion items, and called the story "entertaining", while a reviewer from Eurogamer commented on the game's creative features, such as the player's ability to create their own T-shirts and posters within the game.

Several critics disapprovingly felt the game excessively appealed to a young female demographic. A reviewer from the Official U.S. PlayStation Magazine claimed the game is "decent for tween girls, not anyone else". Its UK counterpart, however, was more unfavorable towards the game, labeling the game as "vomit-inducing". The reviewer also described it as an "unpleasant, explotative drivel aimed at girls who would almost certainly have more fun staring at a blank TV set".

== Sequels ==
The game received three sequels. The first one, Bratz: Forever Diamondz, was released for the PlayStation 2, GameCube, Game Boy Advance, and Nintendo DS in 2006. The other two sequels, Bratz: The Movie (2007) and Bratz: Girlz Really Rock (2008), were both released for the PlayStation 2 and Wii.
