= FurReal Friends =

Toy brand of robotic pets

FurReal
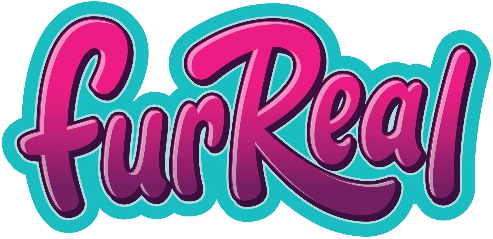
- Product type: Robotic pets
- Current owner: Hasbro (licensed to Just Play Toys)
- Country: United States
- Introduced: 2002; 24 years ago

FurReal Friends (later furReal in 2017) is a toy brand division of Hasbro and formerly of Tiger Electronics and Dreamright Toys created in 2002 focusing on robotic pets. FurReal toys widely vary in style and size, depicting different domesticated animals, dinosaurs, wild animals, and legendary creatures as robotic toys. They are usually small enough to be held, but have been manufactured large enough for children to sit on. Each furReal robotic toy moves to a degree.

Two slogans were "They love you for real, furReal Friends" and, for 2013, "My best friends are FurReal Friends". In 2017, "Make every day magical" was used on Hasbro's furReal webpage.

As of 2023, the brand is licensed to the company Just Play. As of that year, the line had sold over 100 million units across more than 75 countries.

== History ==
The toyline first launched in 2002 with the goal of allowing children to engage with animals without the risks or responsibilities of a real animal. The toyline's launch was a huge success, with outlets reporting that the products were difficult to find in stores due to selling out quickly. Although the toys have been successful, the brand was noted alongside other female-targeted brand Littlest Pet Shop to be a weak seller in 2012.

In 2023, the brand was licensed to Just Play in the hopes of revitalizing the toyline. The first of these new toys were released in 2024.

== Products ==
FurReal are animatronic replications of creatures and animals, and are marketed as an alternative to live pets. The toys seek to emulate the behaviors of common pets, including horses, cats, rabbits and dogs. Toys designed to represent wildlife include elephants, lions, tigers, leopards, jaguars, and bears. There are also models of extinct animals such as dinosaurs, and mythical creatures like unicorns and dragons.

The toys come with an "adoption certificate," that can be filled in with the owner's name and the name of the furReal "pet."

The first furReal Friend was simply called "Cat," and was referred to as female in her 2003 instruction manual. She had sensors in her head, right cheek, left cheek, shoulders, back, and tail. Cat would mimic sleeping and could be woken up by having the top of her head scratched. If not played with or petted for three to five minutes, she would shut down.

Over the years, the toys became more complex and could accomplish a variety of actions. As of 2023, furReal toys' features can include mimicking eating, sleeping, urinating and defecating, as well as walking, grooming, playing music, making sounds and lighting up.

=== Notable models ===
In 2006, Butterscotch Pony was introduced. It is an animatronic pony large enough for small children to sit on. A halter, brush, and toy carrot were included. When sat upon, Butterscotch would "move her head up and down, blink her eyes, and twitch her ears while making soft sounds," according to the toy's manual. Butterscotch was designed with an assortment of sound effects that mimicked those of live horses. It was followed in 2007 by a second animatronic pony named S'mores of slightly higher quality and with more sound effects.

In 2007, the company introduced Squawkers McCaw, an animatronic parrot designed to mimic speech and simulate the experience of a pet bird.

Zambi, a robotic baby elephant, was intended for charitable sales in 2009. The instruction manual thanked the buyer for "adopting" the special edition toy, which also came with a bracelet. Purchases of Zambi supported a charitable fund called Project Zambi, which aimed to benefit children orphaned by AIDS in Africa. The Project Zambi Celebrity Charity Auction, in collaboration with eBay, auctioned off Zambi elephant toys signed by celebrities. The event took place over 10 days, beginning on October 5, 2009. Jaden and Willow Smith were celebrity ambassadors for the fund.

== See also ==
- Furby
- Beanie Babies
- ZhuZhu Pets
- Hatchimals
- Squawkers McCaw
