= Squawkers McCaw =

Animatronic children's toy

- Type: Children's toy
- Invented by: Hasbro
- Company: Fur Real
- Availability: 2007–2009

Squawkers McCaw is an animatronic children's toy bird from Fur Real that acts like a real parrot, specifically the Blue-and-yellow macaw.

The toy comes in a set that includes a toy cracker, a remote control, the parrot itself, a perch and an instruction manual.

The parrot has six different sensors, including a microphone for voice commanding. Activating any of the touch sensors causes the toy to respond by moving or making various noises. The remote control is used to the change the parrot's play modes.

== Summary ==
Squawkers McCaw was introduced in 2007 by Hasbro in the United States. The toy's technology is intended to simulate a real pet bird. The squawking sounds the toy produces are recordings of a parrot, while the phrases the toy "learns" was recorded by 23-year-old E. Shapiro. Feeding the Squawkers McCaw toy with a pretend cracker causes the bird to make affirmative noises, but overfeeding the toy results in the sound of hiccups.

The toy can also speak, with eight pre-programmed English words/phrases in response to vocal cues. Vocabulary is limited on Squawkers McCaw toy birds because the toy is intended for a juvenile audience. All television advertising for Squawkers McCaw was pulled in 2008, and the toy was discontinued in 2009.
