= ERS-7 =

Entertainment robot

AIBO ERS-7

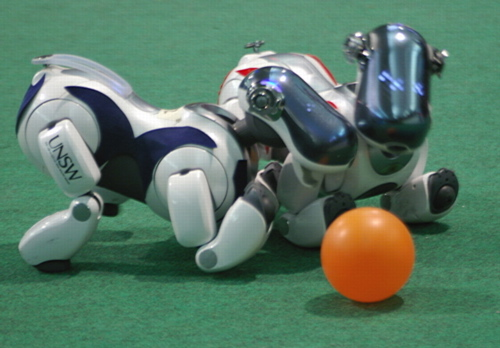
- AIBO ERS-7s at the RoboCup Standard Platform League.
- Manufacturer: Sony
- Year of creation: 2003
- Derived from: ERS-210/220 and ERS-31X
- Replaced by: ERS-1000
- Website: www.sony.jp/products/Consumer/aibo/index2.html

The AIBO ERS-7 is an entertainment robot created for the commercial market. Initially released in 2003, it was the first AIBO installment to be explicitly referred to as a dog and saw adoption in both research and popular culture. It was the last robot developed before the dissolution of Sony's robotics division in 2006 and the eventual release of the ERS-1000 in 2018.

== Hardware ==
The first and only 3rd generation AIBO, the ERS-7 was intended to be the culmination of the product's development to that point. The robot was designed to evoke the theme of 'clean and clear' and implemented an array of LEDs called 'Illume-face', as well as capacitive touch sensors, for the expression of emotion and numeric information.

=== Specifications ===
Technical specifications
CPU	64-bit RISC processor
RAM	64MB
Camera	350,000-pixel CMOS image sensor
Sensors	2 infrared distance sensors (head: 1, chest: 2); 2 capacitive touch sensors (head: 1, back: 1); Pressure sensor (chin); 4 button sensors (paws); Vibration sensor Acceleration sensor
Wireless LAN	IEEE 802.11b/IEEE 802.11; 2.4 GHz WEP connections
Degrees of Freedom	20 (head: 3, leg: 3x4, ear: 1x2, tail: 2, mouth: 1)
Height	180 millimetres (7.1 in)
Width	278 millimetres (10.9 in)
Depth	319 millimetres (12.6 in)
Weight	1.6 kilograms (3.5 lb) including battery pack and Memory Stick

=== Hardware revisions ===
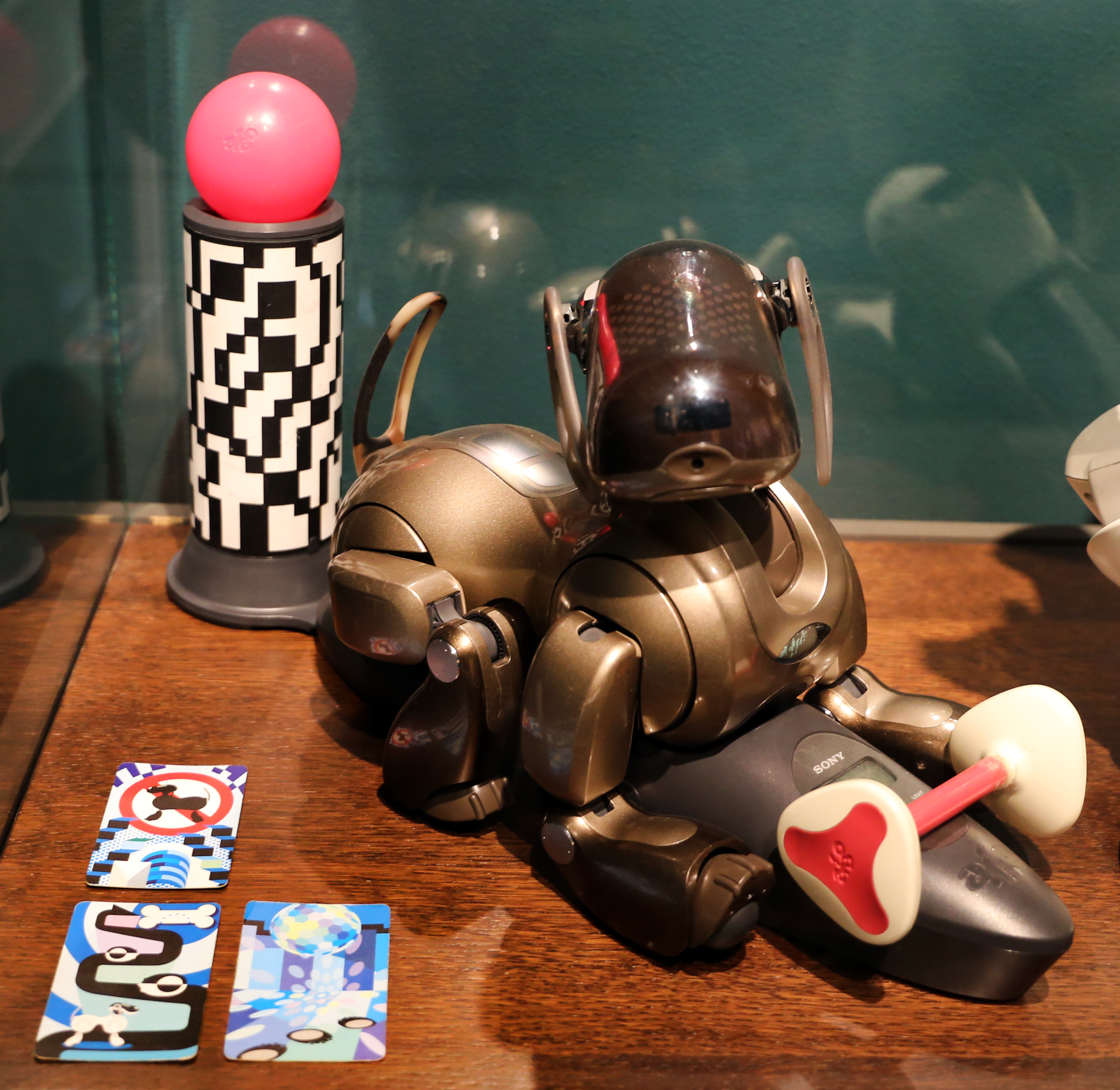
An ERS-7M3/T and accessories.

Model number	Color	Product discontinuation month	Service termination date
ERS-7 /W	Pearl White	Sep 2004	Sep 2011
ERS-7M2 /W	Pearl White	Sep 2005	Sep 2012
ERS-7M2 /B	Pearl Black	Sep 2005	Sep 2012
ERS-7M3 /W	Pearl White	Mar 2006	Mar 2013
ERS-7M3 /B	Pearl Black	Mar 2006	Mar 2013
ERS-7M3 /T	Champagne/Honey Brown	Mar 2006	Mar 2013

The ERS-7 underwent multiple revisions, beginning with the ERS-7M2 in 2004 and followed by the ERS-7M3 in 2005. Every release added an additional available color to the product catalogue and shipped with an updated version of the 'MIND' software.

== Software ==
The ERS-7 used an updated version of Sony's Aperios operating system and OPEN-R application layer present in each AIBO release. Sony distributed the OPEN-R SDK, AIBO Remote Framework, and AIBO Motion Editor for the noncommercial creation of software and published an updated version of the R-CODE scripting language for both commercial and consumer applications.

=== MIND ===
The official software for the ERS-7 existed as a single personality called MIND that received incremental upgrades and service pack updates. This differentiated it from its predecessors, particularly the ERS-210 that offered unique features, such as teleoperation and a virtual pet-like 'life cycle' in separate software packages. MIND was capable of self-charging, recognizing unique faces, and remembering names. Pattern recognition used in targeting the charging station and recognizing AIBO cards was derived from technology developed by Evolution Robotics. Two pieces of PC software were distributed with the initial MIND release, including the WLAN Manager that allowed the user to input network information to interact with AIBO wirelessly and the Custom Manager that enabled the installation of new games and dances distributed as 'custom data packs' on Sony's official website.

==== MIND 2 ====
MIND 2 expanded the original MIND with the ability to recognize favorite objects, monitor a house, and communicate with other robots. It retained the tonal sounds of MIND 1 and introduced the AIBO Entertainment Player, a PC software that allowed the user to control the robot from a computer, take pictures and record videos, announce calendar items, and stream internet radio.

==== MIND 3 ====
MIND 3 enabled AIBO to talk in English and Japanese by manner of pre-recorded voice lines, a feature that could be disabled in favor of tonal beeps. It was capable of short-term memory recall and expanded the functionality of the Custom Manager by allowing the user to modify installed data through the robot's 'voice guide mode' menu.

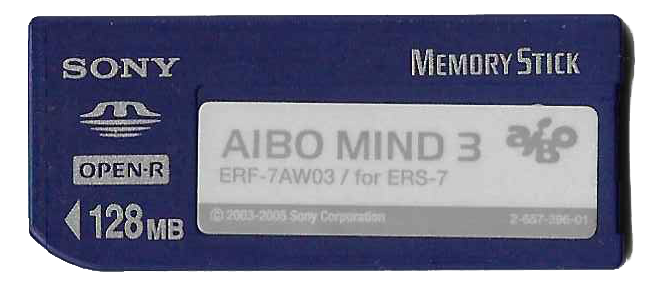
The MIND 3 memory stick.

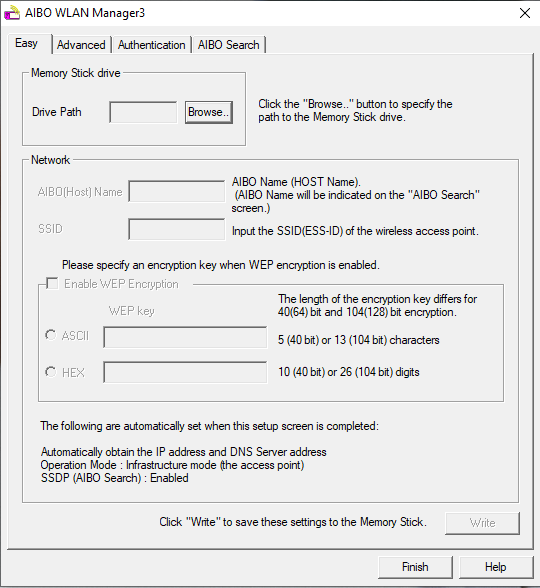
The AIBO WLAN Manager interface.

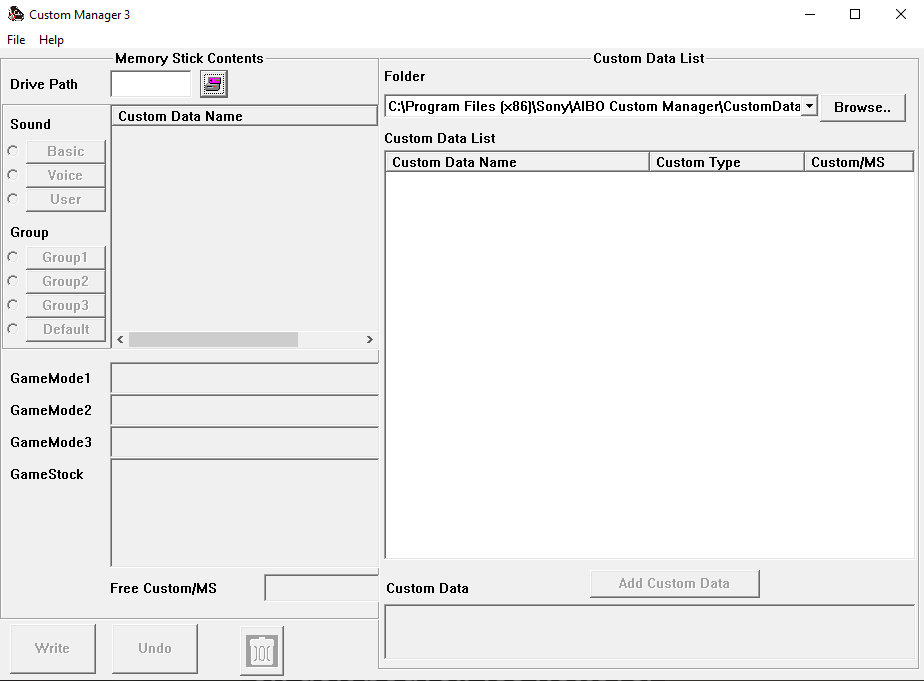
The AIBO Custom Manager interface.

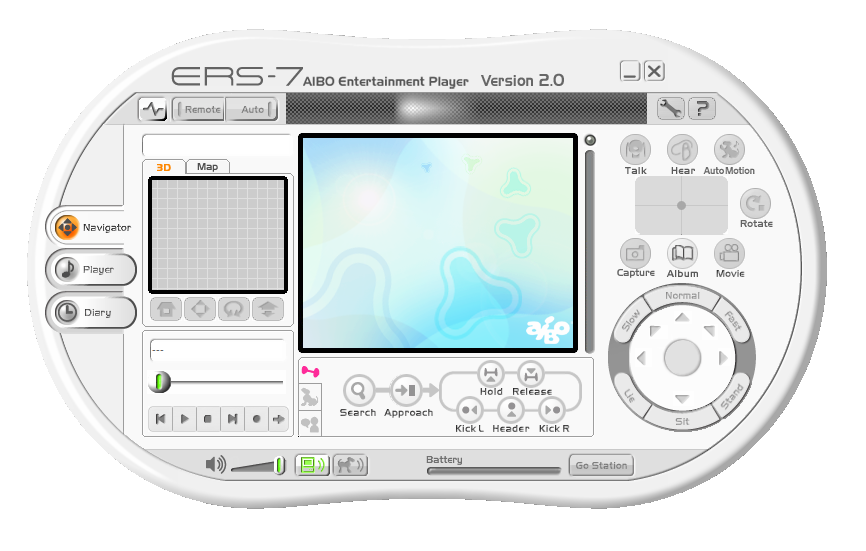
The main AIBO Entertainment Player interface, with navigation selected.

== Research ==
The ERS-7 was widely utilized in academic research. Notably, the platform was the robot selected for the RoboCup Standard Platform League from 2004 to 2008. Some research topics included wireless control and simulation, autonomous learning, and visual processing.

== In popular culture ==
In the 2006 comedy film Click, starring Adam Sandler, the ERS-7 is briefly featured before being run over by the main character's car.

In September 2003, Sony was awarded the Good Design Award in Product Design for the ERS-7.

American artist Stephen Huneck collaborated with Sony for AIBO's 5th anniversary, creating prints featuring both the ERS-7 and Huneck's dog Sally.
