= Tokyo Jungle =

2012 video game

- Developers: Crispy's! Japan Studio
- Publisher: Sony Computer Entertainment
- Director: Yohei Kataoka
- Producer: Masaaki Yamagiwa
- Composer: Taku Sakakibara
- Platforms: PlayStation 3 PlayStation Vita
- Release: PlayStation 3: JP: June 7, 2012; NA: September 25, 2012; PAL: September 26, 2012; Tokyo Jungle Mobile; PlayStation Vita: WW: July 10, 2013
- Genres: Action survival
- Modes: Single-player, multiplayer

Tokyo Jungle (Note: Japanese: トーキョー ジャングル, Hepburn: Tōkyō Janguru) is a science fiction survival action game developed by Crispy's! and Japan Studio and published by Sony Computer Entertainment for the PlayStation 3. The game takes place in a deserted, futuristic Tokyo, in which the city has transformed into a vicious wildlife wasteland.

Tokyo Jungle was released in Japan on June 7, 2012, available on both disc and downloadable versions. The international release of the game became available for download via PSN in North America and the PAL region on September 25 and September 26, 2012, respectively. It was included on the "Best of PlayStation Network Vol. 1" compilation disc, released in NTSC regions on June 18, 2013.

On July 10, 2013, a grid-based version of the game titled Tokyo Jungle Mobile was released on PlayStation Mobile for the PlayStation Vita.

== Gameplay ==
Tokyo Jungle has two modes: Story and Survival.

- In Story mode, the player plays through missions centered around various animals. Eventually, the player will discover the truth behind humankind's disappearance. Pomeranian dogs are key characters in the story, as well as a Sika deer, a beagle, a Tosa Inu, a spotted hyena, lions, and a pair of robotic dogs which resemble AIBOs.
- In Survival mode, the player, or players (there is a local multiplayer), takes control of an animal and fights for survival against other animals for as long as possible. Tokyo Jungle has online leaderboards so the players can compare their survival skills against one another. Smaller animals will fight in groups, and the player's group can win fights against larger animals as long as one member of the group survives the fight.

The player will have to build up a pack of animals. This is easier for some herbivores, which means the player may not necessarily be at a disadvantage even if they choose a weaker type. There are 50 breeds and 80 types of animals in the game, including Pomeranians, lions, crocodiles, tigers, giraffes, hippos, cheetahs, chimpanzees, gazelles, chickens, beagles, hyenas, Sika deer and the de-extinct Dilophosaurus, Deinonychus, moas and woolly mammoths. As the player plays through the game, additional playable animals are unlocked. There are other animals which are available for the player to download as downloadable content from the PlayStation Store, which include an Australian Silky Terrier, a Smilodon, a robot dog, a Peking Man, a (human) office worker, a cat, a panda, and a kangaroo.

== Plot ==
Some time in the twenty-first century, humankind is mostly extinct, leaving animals to fend for themselves. The once busy streets of Tokyo are now home to lions, tigers, chickens, and various other animals. All of them are now fighting for survival.

- After running out of pet food, the Pomeranian now has to fend for itself in a now-wild-and-vicious Tokyo. The bosses he faces are fat cats although one is fought by his children. He ends his story establishing a small pack of Pomeranians.
- Two Sika deer fawns search the hostile streets of Tokyo, looking for their mother. The fawns are separated briefly, and their reunion is short-lived, with one of the two being killed by a cheetah, leaving the other to continue the search. His/her story ends with a series of cold trails leading to a dead end.
- A hungry beagle tries to overthrow a tyrannical Tosa Inu. He builds an army out of his pups to fight the Tosa. The boss he faces is the Tosa himself. The chief beagle later is killed by a hyena.
- The Tosa Inu is injured by the Beagle, and must escape. He then works to regain his lost honor. The Tosa is trained by a bear to fight better, and confronts the entire army of the Nomad Pack, and manages to kill them all. He duels the leader of the pack, the hyena, and kills him. His story ends with him retaking his position, and is implied to have become a leader rather than a tyrant. The boss he faces is in one stage a chimpanzee, a crocodile, a tiger and in his final stage two giant hyenas, a Smilodon and the same hyena that overthrew his master.
- The lioness and her hunting party have to hunt the targeted animals all over the Subway area. The boss she faces is a kangaroo with four rabbit sidekicks. She ends her story going back to her family after hunting.
- The male lion has to defend his pride from the roving male lions. The boss he faces are four hyenas and a nomad rival lion. His story ends with him defeating the pack, allowing his family to live in peace.
- The hyenas are planning to deal with the beagle. The head hyena kills The Beagle, and takes over his territory. The boss he faces is the Beagle himself. His story ends with him fighting the Nomad Lion for control of the pack, with the Tosa's story picking up almost immediately after, where it is discovered he killed the Lion, and runs away from the Tosa, who is trying to kill him. The Tosa catches up to him and fights him, and prevails, with the hyena dying after one last attempt to kill his rival.
- ERC-003 is a robotic dog resembling a Sony AIBO Codenamed "Lily". After being found by ERC-X with its family of two wolves, ERC-003 now has to scan all of Tokyo for the disaster signals being put out by the humans' underground facility. It then faces a moral choice of whether to bring humanity back to Tokyo, or let the animals rule. Choosing yes will end the game, whereas 'no' will trigger a series of final boss fights and what is considered to be the "true ending". The first boss it faces is the Tosa just as the Beagle's was. Unless it decided to bring the humans back, the bosses it faces are its former ERC-X pal, two Deinonychus, two Smilodons and the final boss, the upgraded ERC X named ERC X 2. It either lives with the future humans, or dies from its wounds during a fight saving the animals from being exterminated by the humans.

== Development ==
Director Yohei Kataoka wanted to make a game that felt original, noting that animals and a world without humans were both individually "universal" concepts that could be combined to create something "very catchy, very new and very exciting." After coming up with the setting, Kataoka's team prototyped the concept, with Kataoka drawing animals over photos of an abandoned Tokyo. The team also created a 2D "pitch" video which helped them unify the concept. The team began with only two people, but had expanded to 24 by the end of development. Rather than move into a dedicated office, the team instead worked from a 1,000 square foot home. Electrical issues forced the studio to upgrade the residence, ultimately costing them roughly the same as if they had moved into an office in the first place. Kataoka feels that the team's inexperience in designing games helped the final product, specifically noting that they wouldn't have opted to put so many characters into the game had they realized the work that such a feat entailed.

Japan Studio and Sony Worldwide Studios both criticized the project upon first hearing about it with Kataoka believing that the former balked at the concept. Sony Worldwide Studios was open to the idea, but felt that the gameplay at that stage was lacking.

The game made its debut at the 2010 Tokyo Game Show, with GameSpot writing that the game's quirky concept "make it unlikely to ever see a stateside release". Sony noted on their own PlayStation Blog that most of the early coverage focused on the eccentric concept as opposed to the gameplay. Kataoka noted that he himself was unsure by this point if the game would ever see a release outside of Japan, although interest from European gamers eventually led to a worldwide release.

== Reception ==
Reception

Aggregate score
Aggregator	Score	
Aggregator	PS Vita	PS3
Metacritic	77/100	74/100

Review scores
Publication	Score	
Publication	PS Vita	PS3
Destructoid	N/A	7.5/10
Edge	N/A	7/10
Eurogamer	N/A	9/10
Famitsu	N/A	32/40
Game Informer	N/A	7/10
GameSpot	N/A	5/10
GameTrailers	N/A	7.7/10
GameZone	5/10	8.5/10
Giant Bomb	N/A	4/5
IGN	N/A	8/10
Polygon	N/A	8/10
PlayStation: The Official Magazine	N/A	7/10
Digital Spy	4/5	3/5
The Guardian	N/A	4/5

Tokyo Jungle received "average" reviews, while Tokyo Jungle Mobile received "generally favorable reviews", according to the review aggregation website Metacritic.

Ellie Gibson, writing for Eurogamer, described the game as "basically Grand Theft Auto with lions" and called it "a celebration of classic games, with their ridiculous plots, repetitive tasks, excessive violence and all. It pulls off the impressive and nigh-on impossible trick of being an original homage." Giant Bomb's Patrick Klepek also praised the game, calling it a "well-designed, supremely funny game". Klepek went on to praise the game's animal variety and the system for unlocking new animals, as well as the loot system and the story mode. However, he criticized the game's inclusion of certain animals as paid downloadable content. In Japan, Famitsu gave it a score of all four eights for a total of 32 out of 40.

The Digital Fix said that "The mechanics are simple, graphics average, plotting ludicrous but it is never dull and if you don't have a story to tell your gamer friends after every time you play it then you are doing it wrong." The Escapist similarly said it was "utterly ridiculous but wholly unique, blending challenging gameplay with goofy trappings. ... The mixture of absurd and serious is addictive and surprising." The Guardian said that, "Despite its tongue-in-cheek nature, Tokyo Jungle is a superb game. It feels quite unlike anything else (the best description of it would be a stealth-action-survival-RPG), it's laugh-out-loud funny and incredibly moreish." Anime News Network called it "a low-key experience where you can do approximately three things (eat, sleep, and mate). There isn't much in the way of cutscenes and there isn't much in the way of story ... and [it is] about as good an experience of harrowed persistence as any game is likely to give." However, Digital Spy gave it three stars out of five and called it "a unique title which, while not without its flaws, is wildly entertaining..." The same website also gave the Vita version four stars out of five, saying, "Fans of the original will still probably be willing to look past Tokyo Jungle Mobile's awkward controls and less involved combat, and if they do they will find much of the same addicting survival gameplay intact hiding underneath."

In an interview with Siliconera, director Yohei Kataoka was asked about Tokyo Jungle's reception outside Japan: "Europe loved it, and we got a lot of great feedback from that audience, but [in] America... that simply wasn't the case. We received a lot of negative feedback for the game."
