= Toshitada Doi =

Japanese electrical engineer

- Born: February 2, 1943 (age 83); Japan
- Education: Tokyo Institute of Technology; Tohoku University
- Occupation: Engineer

Toshitada Doi (土井 利忠, Doi Toshitada; born February 2, 1943) is a Japanese electrical engineer, who played a significant role in the digital audio revolution. He received a degree in electrical engineering from the Tokyo Institute of Technology in 1964, and a PhD from Tohoku University in 1972.

He joined Sony Japan in 1964 and started the first digital audio project within Sony. He was the driving force behind the PCM adaptor, and was a prominent member of the Sony/Philips taskforce responsible for the design of the Compact Disc. He created, among others, the CIRC error correction system. He, with Kees Immink, refutes the myth that the Compact Disc's playing time was determined by Beethoven's Ninth Symphony.

He was the lead engineer of the DASH multi-track digital audio tape recorder. In the 1990s, he headed Sony's Digital Creatures Laboratory, where he was responsible for the Aibo, Sony's robotic dog. In 2003, Doi created the Qrio, a running humanoid robot.

== Awards and honors ==
- Fellowship, Audio Engineering Society
- Eduard Rhein Prize, 1981
- Silver Medal, Audio Engineering Society
