= Stevanne Auerbach =

American educator, child development expert, writer

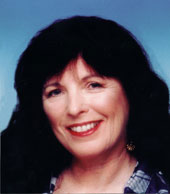
- Born: September 22, 1938; Queens, New York, U.S.
- Died: October 19, 2022 (aged 84); San Lorenzo, California, U.S.
- Occupations: Author; child development specialist; educator; toyologist
- Children: Amy

Stevanne Auerbach (September 22, 1938 – October 19, 2022), also known as Dr. Toy, was an American educator, child development expert, writer and toyologist. She was best known for being an expert on as well as an advocate of toys, play and the toy industry. After more than fifty years in the field of toys, she was named one of seven Wonder Women of Toys in 2007 by Women in Toys and Playthings magazine. She was a frequent guest speaker on toys and play for all ages at industry, professional, parent and public meetings. She made several public appearances each year to promote her causes, which include building greater awareness in parents of their essential role as play tutors for their children, the educational, and many other benefits of play, and to encourage the enhancement of play value and high standards of quality, safety, and protection of creativity in toys within the toy industry.

== Theory ==
Auerbach uses the term "Play Quotient" or "PQ" to refer to personality traits of individuals and how this interacts with play value, a characteristic of toys, games and other playthings. Her theory is propounded in her book, Dr. Toy's Smart Play—Smart Toys: How to Select and Use the Best Toys and Games, 4th Edition released by Regent Press, and first published in 1998.

== Education ==
Dr. Auerbach completed her undergraduate work in education and psychology at Queens College (1960), and also attended the University of Maryland between 1961 and 1962 for courses in child study, guidance and counseling. She received her MA in special education at George Washington University (1965), and for doctoral work conducted the first cross-cultural study of parents whose children were enrolled in child care as to their expectations and needs. Her study was published by the Far West Laboratory for Educational Research and Development. She conducted her study with the help of interpreters so that parents could more easily speak in their own language including Cantonese, Spanish and Tagalog. Dr. Auerbach was awarded a Ph.D. in child development from Union Institute (1973).

== Early background ==
Her early professional background included teaching in New York City, Maryland and the District of Columbia as a teacher in both suburban and inner city schools, and special needs. She worked at the American Personnel and Guidance Association in Washington, D.C., (now the American Counseling Association) and created the first Film Festival for Counselors, the NVGA National Vocational Guidance Association Guide to Occupational Literature, several reports, and writing the first booklet on Opportunities in the Peace Corps.

While enrolled at George Washington University, she was involved in a national survey of legislation providing for Special Education in each state for the Council for Exceptional Children. She prepared a report on Physical Education for the Kennedy Foundation that led to the formation of the Special Olympics. She was also Resource Specialist for a five-state center for teachers of special needs children based at George Washington University. In that position she identified products that provide support to special needs children, parents and teachers.

In the late 1960s, she became a staff member of the U.S. Department of Education and later the Office of Economic Opportunity. At this office, she evaluated Title I programs, created The What Works Series of promising practices, and was responsible for approving the first grant to Sesame Street. She worked for Dr. James Edward Allen, Assistant Secretary for Education.

As a mother herself, Auerbach organized the first in-house child care center in the headquarters of the Department of Education for the children of employees of the Agency. This center became a widely copied model in other government agency offices throughout Washington D.C. and the rest of the country. The original center remains in operation.

== Toy museum ==
Auerbach was also founder and director of the San Francisco International Toy Museum which she operated from 1986 to 1990 at the Cannery overlooking San Francisco's Fisherman's Wharf waterfront. This was a hands-on, children's museum where over 50,000 children learned about the history of toys, and were able to play with and test out new toys and other products. Unfortunately, the museum was forced to close due to the Loma Prieta earthquake in 1989.

== Articles and books ==
During her career which has spanned more than 50 years she has produced 17 books, and scores of articles for a wide variety of publications and given innumerable interviews for radio and television journalists and for print publications and online web sites. She was syndicated for 5 years of weekly articles for King Features and wrote for The Huffington Post which archived her weekly articles.

She is interviewed during the holiday season for her opinions on play and toy issues and the best toys by various media outlets, local, national and international. She has written 5 books including: "My Butterfly Collection", Smart Play Smart Toys, Toys for a Lifetime, The Toy Chest, and The Whole Child. Dr. Auerbach also wrote Confronting the Childcare Crisis and compiled a four-volume anthology, Child Care a Comprehensive Guide.
