= Robotic pet =

Artificially intelligent machine made to be a pet

Robotic pets, robo-pets or pet robots, are artificially intelligent machines that are made to resemble actual pets. While the first robotic pets produced in the late 1990s were not too advanced, they have since grown technologically. Many now use machine learning (algorithms that allow machines to adapt to experiences independent of humans), making them much more realistic. Most consumers buy robotic pets with the aim of getting similar companionship that biological pets offer, without some of the drawbacks that come with caring for live animals. The pets on the market currently have a wide price range, from the low hundreds into the several thousands of dollars. Multiple studies have been done to show that we treat robotic pets in a similar way as actual pets, despite their obvious differences. However, there is some controversy regarding how ethical using robotic pets is, and whether or not they should be widely adopted in elderly care.

== History ==
The first known robotic pet was a robot dog called Sparko, built by the American company Westinghouse in 1940. It never got sold due to poor public interest.

The first robotic pets to be put on the market were Hasbro's Furby in 1998 and Sony's AIBO in 1999. Since then, robotic pets have grown increasingly advanced.

The shapes of the robotic pet includes:

- familiar animals
- nonfamiliar animals
- imaginary animals or characters

Some popular robotic pets today are:

- Joy for All (by Hasbro) Companion Pets
- Zoomer Interactive Animals (Usually Kittens and Puppies)
- PARO Robot Seals by Intelligent Systems Co.
- AIBO (upgraded) by Sony
- Loona Petbot by KEYi Tech
- FurReal Friends by Hasbro
- Little Live Pets by Moose Toys
- EMO Pet by Living AI
- Hatchimals
- Pets Alive by the Hong Kong-based company ZURU
- Present Pets by Spin Master

== Common Uses ==
The primary consumer group is elderly people that live alone or in nursing homes, who often suffer from loneliness and social isolation. For this group, robotic pets can be helpful because they often are unable to consistently walk, feed, or otherwise take care of an actual pet. Robotic pets are also marketed towards dementia patients, who are people that suffer from loss of memory and thinking skills. These people often suffer extreme loneliness due to not remembering their loved ones, but having physical contact and constant reminders of a robotic pet can lessen that feeling. For example, a study done in Texas and Kansas found that dementia residents who had group sessions with a PARO (brand of robotic pet) for three months showed decreased anxiety and less behavioral problems, when compared to a control group that experienced activities in a traditional nursing home, such as music and physical activity.

Robotic Pets can be helpful when it comes to patients unable to perform consistent physical action because AIBO performs slower than a live animal. In addition, patients unable to contact their loved ones due to infectious diseases can be eased the loneliness feeling when interacting with AIBO. The new AIBO ERS-1000 AIBO model can be used in household use or therapy. Furthermore, a Qualitative study associated with National Centre for Child Health and Development (NCCHD) has shown the bright future of robot-assisted therapy during special medical care. The experiment was conducted with children who were hospitalised in NCCHD; two physicians observed the participants throughout the experiment and rendered a qualitative analysis to evaluate the possibility of applying robotic Pet in medical. The result of the experiments in National Centre for Child Health and Development (NCCHD) was given out a dominant positive result when the children interact with AIBO (ERS-1000); the research has proved that robot-assisted therapy was effectively medically purposed, especially in the case of a pediatric ward.

== Affordability ==
When robotic pets were first introduced into the market, they were not very financially feasible for most people. Even now, there remains a large price gap between different types of robotic pets. For example, PAROs robotic pet seals cost $6,120, making them unaffordable to most individual consumers. They are therefore bought more by nursing homes, hospitals, or other institutions. On the other end of the price spectrum are Joy For All's Companion Pets. These only cost about $120, which makes it more realistic for individual consumers, such as elderly adults who live alone.

Currently, there is very little insurance coverage available for robotic pet owners. Medicare only covers the costs of certain robotic pets (PARO) for use by therapists, not by any individuals. However, Medicaid and some private insurers are exploring the idea of including robotic pets in their healthcare. If this were to happen, it would significantly boost the sales of the pets.

In 2018, Sony relaunched their discontinued AIBO with a friendly puppy appearance; the new model was released with various significant upgrades compared to the ERS-7 model. The price for a 2018 AIBO (ERS-1000) falls around US$3.000; the price has gone up due to a new design with state of the art sensors integrated into the ERS-1000 model.

== Effectiveness ==
Since the effectiveness of a robotic pet depends heavily on how much consumers see it as a real animal, multiple studies have been done comparing robotic pets to other things, such as live animals and inanimate objects (toys). The studies often focus on whether the robot / animal / toy is seen to have the following characteristics:

Characteristic	Definition	Example Question
Biological / Physical Essence	Whether or not something is alive	Can it eat?
Mental State	Whether or not something can have feelings	Can it be happy?
Sociability	Whether or not something is capable of being a companion	Can you be friends with it?
Moral Standing	Whether or not something is responsible for their actions	Can you justify physically punishing it if it does something wrong?

=== Robotic Pet vs Stuffed Animal ===
One study in 2004 compared how children interacted with Sony's AIBO versus with a stuffed dog. The researchers did this by letting the children play with either the stuffed toy or the AIBO for three minutes, and then asking the children a series of questions to determine how they viewed each one. The study found that, when the children were asked questions about the characteristics of either AIBO or the stuffed animal, they responded in similar ways. This held true when they were asked questions concerning biological essence, mental states, sociability, and moral standing. However, there were differences in how the children behaved with AIBO versus the stuffed animal. For example, in the questionnaire the children responded that both the AIBO and the stuffed dog could hear verbal commands. But when the researchers observed how the children interacted with the AIBO or stuffed dog, they found that more children gave verbal commands to the AIBO.

=== Robotic Pet vs Live Animal ===
Another study in 2005 compared children's interactions with the AIBO and with a live dog. The researchers did this by letting the children play freely with either the AIBO or the real dog for five minutes, and then asking the children a series of questions to determine how they viewed each one. The study found that more children preferred to play with the live dog over the AIBO, and more children affirmed that the live dog had a physical essence, a mental state, sociability, and moral standing. However, the researchers found that the AIBO was given some dog-like attributes, even if not treated entirely like the dog. For example, many of the children thought the AIBO could have feelings, such as happiness or sadness. Some also thought that the AIBO could be their friend, and that it wasn't okay to kick the AIBO if it did something bad.

Both these studies concluded that robotic pets such as AIBO often aren't categorized as either alive or inanimate, but rather in a new category in between the other two. For example, children in the first study treated the AIBO differently than they treated the stuffed toy, even though they stated that the two were very similar. In contrast, the children in the second study stated that the live dog was different from the AIBO, but ended up treating the two similarly. These findings show that we consciously identify robotic pets as inanimate objects, but we behave as if they are closer to real pets than they are to toys.

=== Animal Assisted Therapy vs Robot-Assisted Therapy ===
A study in the United States was conducted on animal-assisted therapy (AAT); the study was carried out to evaluate the effectiveness of the therapy pet method. Participants interact with animals as a pet owner plays with their Pet; the experiment's outcomes were reported with many physical and mental improvements for the participants. However, the concern of transmitted diseases from animals posed a reconsideration from institutions when they consider animal-assisted therapy. In addition, A qualified therapy animal requires a well-trained session and a licensed caregiver, which randomly escalate the operating fees to the service. Opposite to animal-assisted therapy, robot-assisted therapy overcomes the draws back of animal-assisted therapy, and there are studies conducted to justify the possibility of robotic Pet in the medical field. In the study, AIBO is the selected subject for the research. AIBO was used to companion Elderly and hospitalised children. The robot-assisted method has already been applied to many cases, namely aged care, workplace, vulnerable social groups. Robot-assisted therapy comes at a lower cost than animal-assisted therapy. The robot does not need to feed or a licensed professional trainer; ultimately, the robotic Pet hygienic standard is higher than live animals. AIBO-assisted therapy has given positive results, such as stimulating social-emotional function for vulnerable social groups and mental health well-being with elders in the aged-care facility.

The conclusion from the above studies, animal-assisted therapy (AAT) or robot-assisted therapy (RAT) has shown positive results from patients. Robot-assisted therapy can replace animal-assisted therapy in the particular unavoidable situation as social activity support for infectious illness patients, restricted movement patients, elderly whose vulnerable to animal transmitted diseases. In contrast, the animal-assisted therapy study's result shows the positive level of participants higher than robot-assisted therapy; this method was still limited by the cultural beliefs about the cleanliness of the animals; notably, the budget for this method is more pricey than the alternative therapy. Ultimately, with the advancement in robotic technology, robot-assisted therapy gradually can replace live animal therapy because of the safeness of the vulnerable target patient. also, the robot-assisted therapy had proved delightful positive results when it was conducted in a large scale study.

== Controversy ==
While robotic pets have proven to be beneficial to many consumers, especially those who are elderly, there remains some controversy about certain ethical issues. One study from 2016 attempted to discuss two main ethical considerations: elderly consumers may not be able to recognize that the robots aren't actual pets, and that the robot pets will come to replace human interaction. Those who participated in the study came to the conclusion that for most consumers, neither issue is major concern. They found that most robotic pet owners understood that the robot pet was animated, even if they formed a pet-like relationship with it. Additionally, the study participants argued that the robotic pets would more likely be used in a way that facilitated more social interactions in a group setting, such as at a dog park. However, these issues continue to cause debate because there is a minority of consumers, including many dementia patients, who may fail to recognize that the robot is animated.

A robotic pet can mimic animal gestures, and the pet robot's design can look close to a natural pet. In this situation, AIBO ERS-1000 inherited an appearance close to a puppy, and the behaviour can be developed based on the owner interactions. The new AIBO was integrated with cloud memory. The data will be sent online to process and keep AIBO updated; with this function, AIBO behaviours can develop from a new puppy to a mature dog.
