= AIBO =

Series of entertainment robotic dogs

Aibo
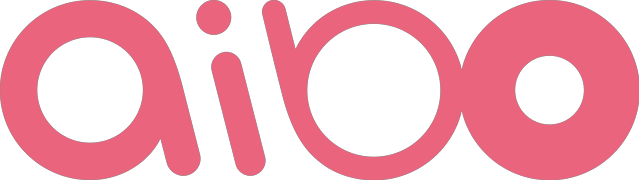

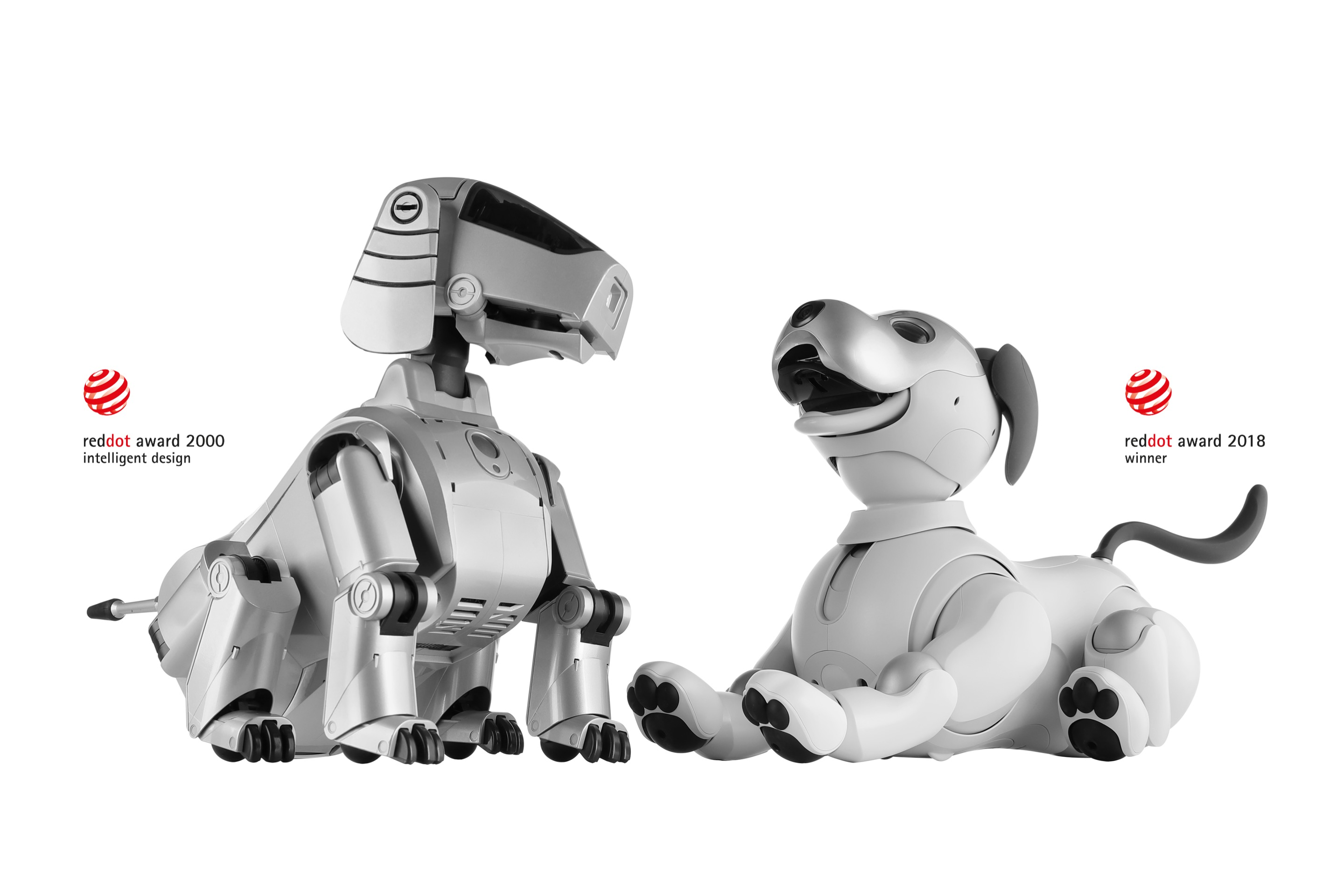
- First-generation Sony AIBO ERS-110 (left) and fourth-generation Sony AIBO ERS-1000 (right)
- Manufacturer: Sony Corporation
- Inventor: Sony's Digital Creatures Lab and Toshitada Doi
- Country: Japan
- Year of creation: 1999; 27 years ago
- Type: Dog
- Purpose: Entertainment
- Website: http://aibo.com

AIBO (Artificial Intelligence RoBOt, homonymous with aibō (相棒), "pal" or "partner" in Japanese) is a series of robotic dogs designed and manufactured by Sony. The first consumer model was introduced on 11 May 1999 and was followed by updated generations. Sony announced the discontinuation of AIBO on 26 January 2006 in an effort to make the company more profitable. It was later brought back with a new fourth generation model, released on 11 January 2018.

Although most models were inspired by dogs, other inspirations included lion cubs and space explorers. Only the ERS-7, ERS-110/111 and ERS-1000 versions were explicitly a "robotic dog", but the 210 can also be considered a dog due to its Jack Russell Terrier appearance and face. In 2006, AIBO was added into the Carnegie Mellon University Robot Hall of Fame.

== History ==
The AIBO product line was developed at Sony's Computer Science Laboratory (CSL). Founded in 1990, CSL was set up to emulate the innovation center at the Xerox's Palo Alto Research Center (PARC). CSL's first product was the Aperios operating system, which later formed the base software used by some AIBO models. When Nobuyuki Idei became president of Sony in 1995, he sought to adopt a digital agenda and gave greater prominence to CSL.

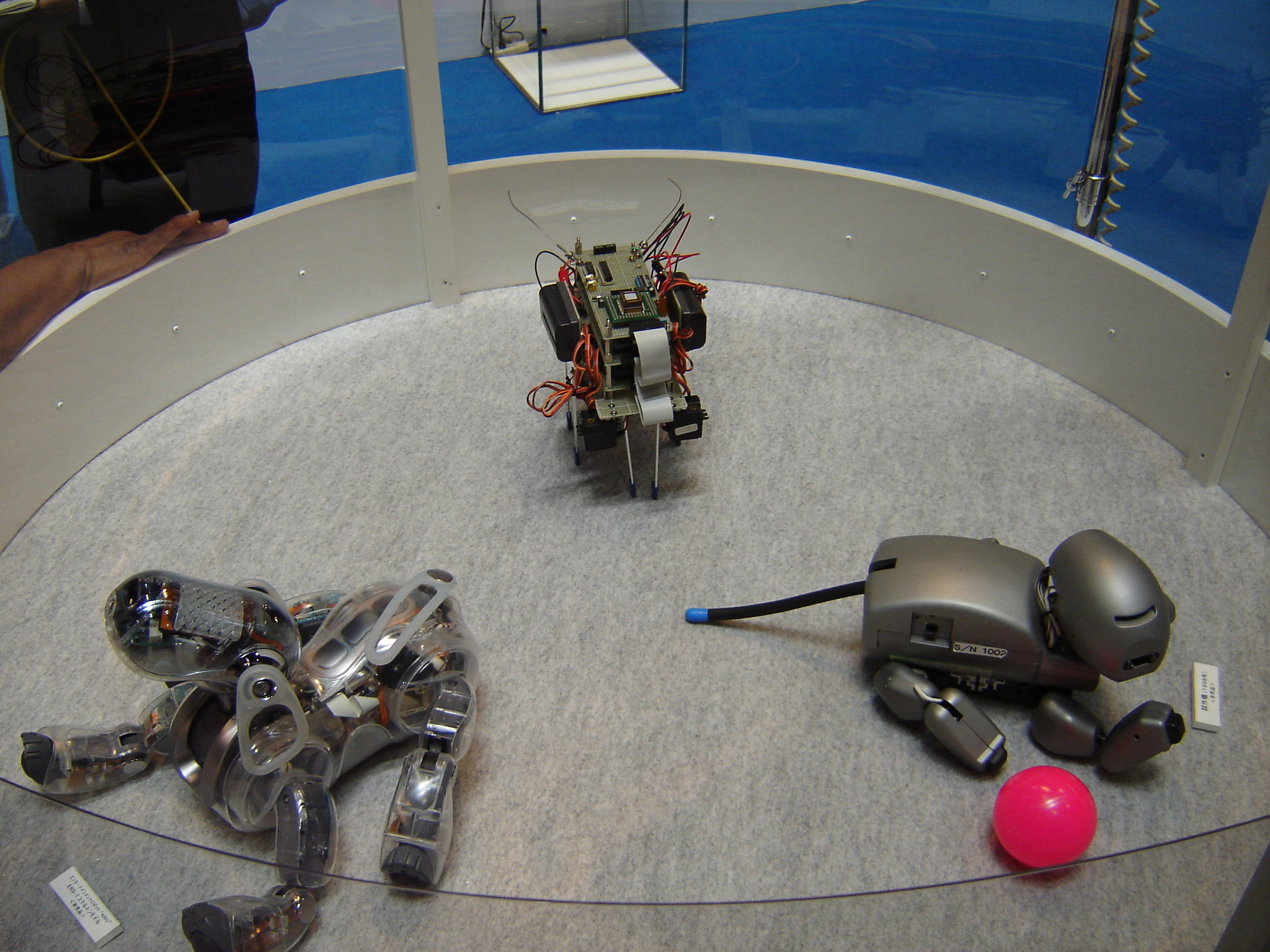
Two AIBO prototypes and transparent ERS-7

Dr. Toshitada Doi is credited as AIBO's original progenitor: in 1994 he had started work on robots at CSL with artificial intelligence expert Masahiro Fujita. Fujita felt that the robots' behaviors needed to "be sufficiently complex or unexpected so that people keep an interest in watching or taking care of it". Fujita argued at the time that, while technologies such as voice recognition and vision were not mature enough for critical applications, their limited capabilities could be a novel, interesting and attractive feature for "appropriately designed entertainment robots". His early monkey-like prototype "MUTANT" included behaviors such as tracking a yellow ball, shaking hands, karate strikes and sleeping, all of which were later adopted in AIBOs. Fujita received the IEEE Inaba Technical Award for Innovation Leading to Production for AIBO as "the world's first mass-market consumer robot for entertainment applications".

Artist Hajime Sorayama was enlisted to create the initial designs for the AIBO's body. Those designs are now part of the permanent collections of the Museum of Modern Art (MoMA) and the Smithsonian Institution. The first generation AIBO design won Japan's prestigious Good Design Award, Grand Prize and a special Intelligent Design award at the 2000 German Red Dot awards. AIBO was also included in Pirouette: Turning Points in Design, a 2025 exhibition at the MoMA featuring "widely recognized design icons [...] highlighting pivotal moments in design history."

In 1997 Doi received backing from Idei to form Sony's Digital Creatures Lab. Believing that robots would be commonplace in households by 2010, but aware of the shortcomings of available technology for functional uses, he decided to focus on robots for entertainment. Depending on the software and model, AIBO can respond to over 100 voice commands in either their own tonal language or voice recordings to mimic human speech, as well as make other noises. Two of the first generation AIBOs exported into the US came to New York, NY and one remains in the archives and displays at Artspace Company Y LLC. Sony announced a prototype Aibo in mid-1998.

Later models of AIBOs were designed jointly with prestigious Japanese designers, and continued to gain design awards. The ERS-210 design was inspired by lion cubs. The bodies of the "ERS-3x" series (Latte and Macaron, the round-headed AIBOs released in 2001) were designed by visual artist Katsura Moshino winning the Good Design Award. The sleek and futuristic, space-exploration inspired body of the "ERS-220" was designed by Shoji Kawamori, winning the Good Design Award and a Design for Asia award. The ERS-7 also won a Good Design Award.

Almost ten years later, Idei's successor, Howard Stringer closed down AIBO and other robotic projects. Doi then staged a mock funeral, attended by more than 100 colleagues from Sony. At the ceremony, Doi said that the AIBO was a symbol of a risk-taking spirit at Sony that was now dead. Sony's AIBO customer support was withdrawn gradually, with support for the final ERS-7M3 ending in March 2013. In July 2014, Sony stopped providing repairs for AIBO products and did not provide customer support or repair for the older AIBO robots.

In November 2017, Sony Corporation announced that AIBO would return with a new model that would be capable of forming an emotional bond with users. The fourth generation model, ERS-1000, was launched in Japan on 11 January 2018. The second lottery sale was set on 6 February 2018.

== Models ==
=== Prototypes ===
Several prototypes have been displayed by Sony. Early models were insect-like with six legs. The specifications and design of the 1997 and 1998 prototypes, described in a Sony press release, closely match those of the first generation AIBOs. Differences include the use of PC Cards for memory (rather than Memory Stick media), the use of two batteries, and the option to use a 2-wheeled "rolling module" in place of legs.

=== First generation models (11x) ===
==== ERS-110 ====
The first commercially available AIBO, the ERS-110 has a beagle-like appearance and is silver with a golden-brown hue and grey claws. There was a limited production of 5,000 units: 3,000 for Japan and 2,000 for the US market. Sales began on 1 June 1999 and sold out via the Internet in 20 minutes. It is often considered the rarest model of AIBO. The ERS-110 cost 250,000 yen, or US$2,500, which would convert to over $3,500 as of 2020.

==== ERS-111 ====
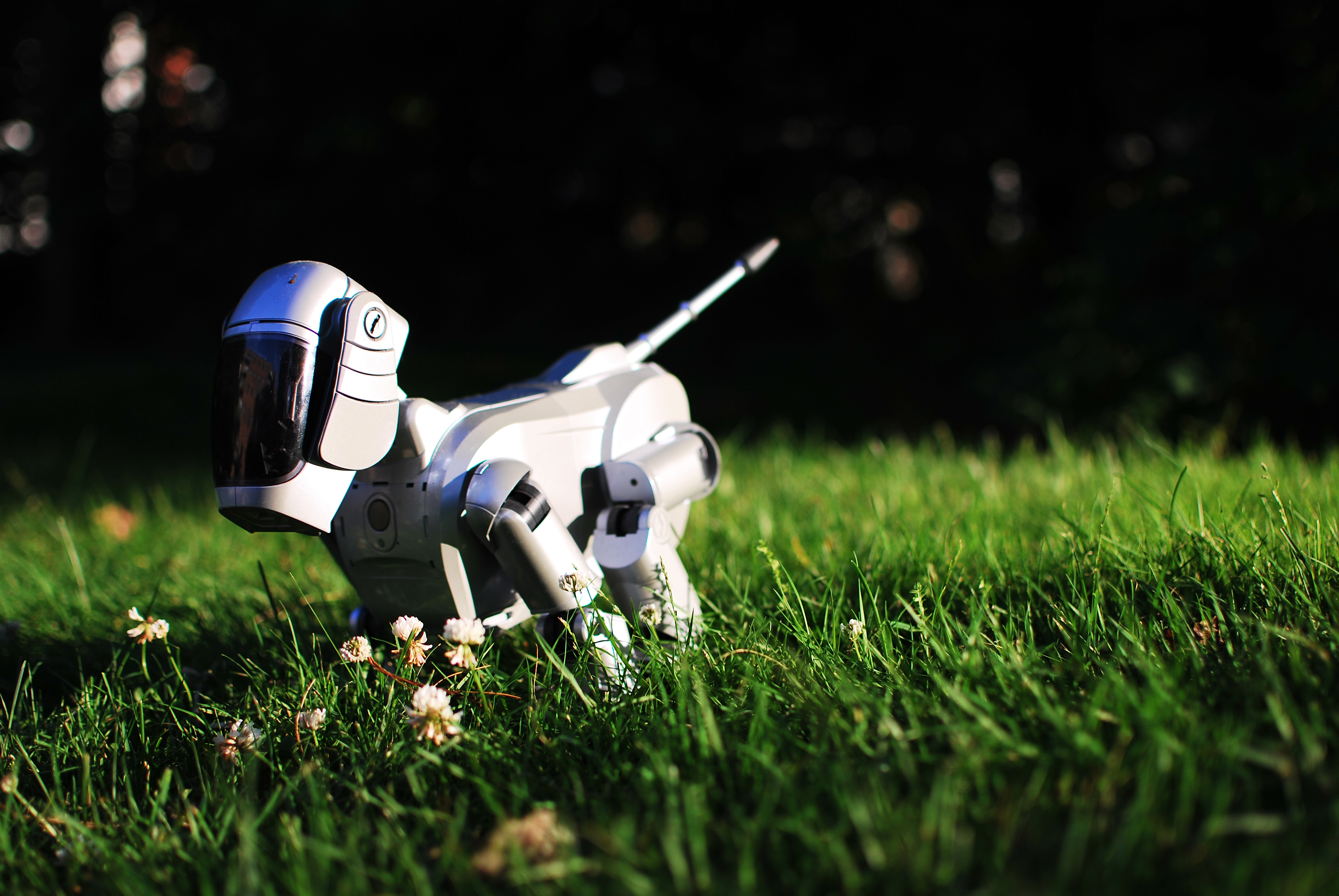
ERS-111

The ERS-111 was released in November 1999 and was an improved version of the original AIBO marketed at the same price. It has a similar appearance to ERS-110, with differently shaped ears and a slightly shorter tail, and was available in metallic black or shiny silver with black claws. 40,000 units were manufactured.

=== Second generation models (2x0, 31x) ===
==== ERS-210 ====
The ERS-210 was designed to look like a lion cub but was essentially a dog-shape with a flat bull terrier face and Jack Russell Terrier appearance. Initially available in black, silver and gold, it was later released in a variety of Special Edition colors (Holiday Red, Holiday White, Spring White, Spring Orange, Everest White (pearlescent with pink and blue undertones), Mazeran Green, Sapphire Violet and the final color, Cyber Blue). It featured speech recognition capabilities and was the most popular AIBO model with over 65,000 units sold. It sold for around $1,500 at launch which was later reduced to less than $1,000.

==== ERS-220 ====
The ERS-220 had a more futuristic design based on a space exploration robot concept by Shoji Kawamori. It had a chrome finish with a retractable headlight and colored LEDs. Between 5,000 and 7,000 units were sold, priced at 180,000 yen. Remote operation was possible through an optional wireless local area network. Specifications: height 29.6 cm, 1.5 kg weight, 1.5 hours (default) continuous operation time, 2.5 hours or more operation with a re-celled battery, 16 degrees of freedom (drive unit).

==== ERS-210A/220A ====
Variants of ERS-210/220 were later released with an improved CPU and head clutch, fixing the problem known in the fandom as DHS (droopy head syndrome) that occurs almost ubiquitously over time with standard 210/220 models. Nearly identical in appearance to the earlier models, they were distinguished by the Super Core logo on the underside of the body. They cost US$1299 at launch.

==== ERS-31x (Latte and Macaron) ====
The ERS-31x models had an "AIBO's heart" slogan. The original production design illustrator was Katsura Moschino. The price was 98,000 yen or US$950. The "Latte" (ERS-311) is an off-white/cream color with purple eyes and is considered the "friendly" model. The "Macaron" (ERS-312) is mostly black with cream accents and blue eyes and is considered the "naughty" model. (The "friendly" and "naughty" variations were only present in Japanese-language versions of software, though, with English-language versions always running the "friendly" Latte version.) The "Pug" (ERS-31L) is the least common of the three and was $200 cheaper at launch. The ERS-31L has the same body shape but a different face design and is a light brown color. The 31x series dogs are considered to look like a bichon puppy or a bear cub (to the extent that a panda outfit was released specifically for this trio).

==== ERS 31xB ====
These models are aesthetically identical to the ERS-311 and ERS-312 and feature Bluetooth connection to a handheld "handy" viewer (released only in Japan) which would "translate Aibos thoughts and feelings into text" and enable the handler to play games with them. They can also run some Bluetooth-specific software variations.

=== Third generation models (7Mx) ===
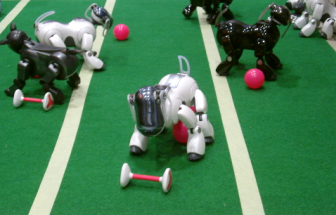
ERS-7

The ERS-7 and its successive iterations were the third generation of AIBO robots and the final ones released before the product line's 2006 discontinuation. They were first sold in 2003 and priced between $1500 and $2000. It has been estimated that ERS-7 sold 15,000 units of each variant, M1 to M3, for a total of 45,000 units. The ERS-7M1 was released only in white, the ERS-7M2 was released in white and black, and the ERS-7M3 was released in white, black, and champagne brown.

=== Fourth generation models ===
==== ERS-1000 ====
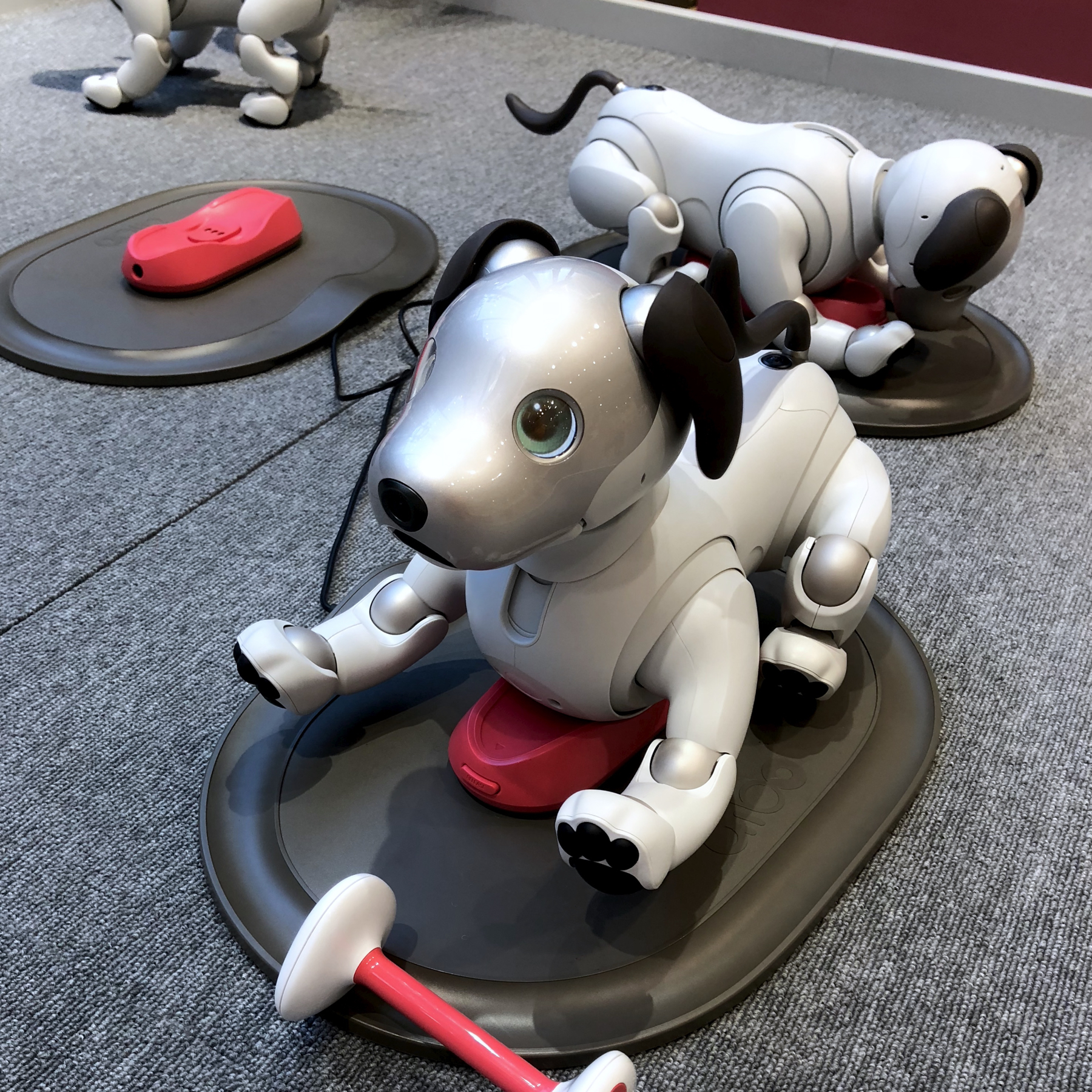
ERS-1000

The ERS-1000 was the first aibo model in the product line's revival, released in January 2018. It is equipped with an LTE SIM card to support interaction and learning via cloud computing, requiring a persistent Internet connection and subscription to function fully. This model has a less-robotic and more animal-like appearance than other models. The ERS-1000 can recognize up to 100 faces, responds to over 50 voice commands, and can learn a customizable trick. It sells for about $3,000 and is still available as of 2026.

=== QRIO ===
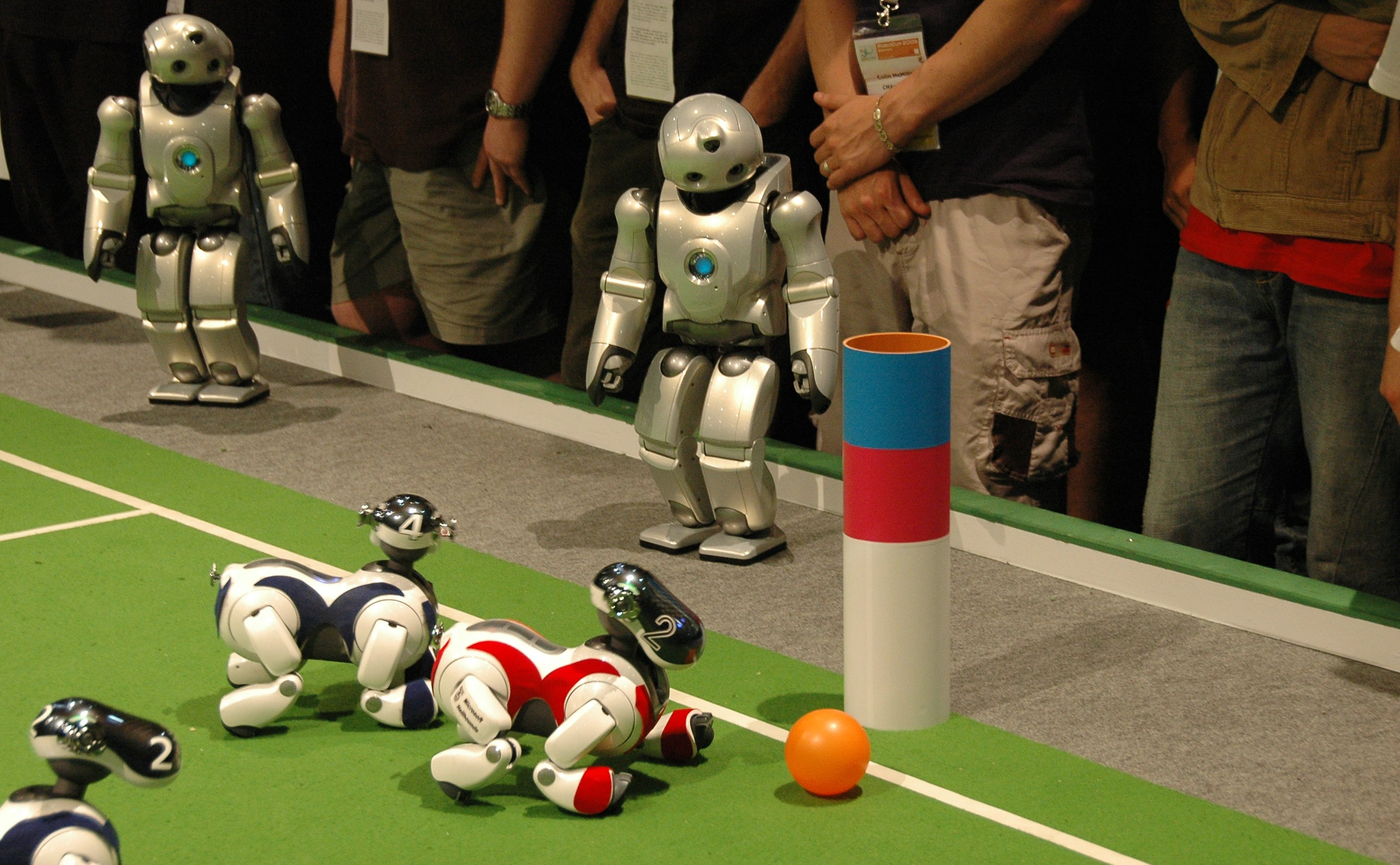
QRIOs watch AIBOs at a Robocup event.

The humanoid QRIO robot was designed as the successor to AIBO and runs the same base R-CODE and Aperios operating system. Its development was halted prior to commercial release.

== Hardware ==
The initial ERS-110 AIBO's hardware includes a 64-bit RISC processor, 16 megabytes of RAM, sensors (touch, camera, range-finder, microphone, acceleration, angular velocity), a speaker, and actuators (legs, neck, mouth, tail). As the series developed, more sensors and actuators were added. During the latter half of the second aibo model, 2x0, a revised model named Super Core was released which fixed a flaw in the robots' head clutch which over time caused tilting, panning, and drooping issues, also known as PAS, TAS, and DHS. These revision models also included a much faster processor, hence the name Super Core. Wi-Fi was available as an add-on for some second-generation AIBOs. The third family of AIBOs, the ERS-7s, have multiple head and body sensors, clicking ear actuators, a chest-mounted proximity sensor, expressive "Illume-Face" and Wi-Fi connectivity.

All AIBOs were bundled with accessories including a charging station and pink ball toy. Late-model ERS7's were bundled with a pink AIBone bone-shaped toy (as did the AIBO ERS-1000 models), playing cards, and a charging station with a pole and marker mat for autonomous docking.

	MUTANT prototype	1998 Prototype	ERS-110	ERS-7	ERS-1000
Processor	IDT R3052 or R3071 ×2 @ 30 MHz	MIPS 64 Bit RISC Processor	64-bit RISC processor @ 50 MHz	MIPS R7000 @ 576 MHz	Qualcomm Snapdragon 820 (APQ8096)
RAM	8 MB	8 MB	16 MB	64 MB	4 GB
Flash memory	2 MB			4 MB	32 GB
Moving parts	16 degrees of freedom	4 legs with 3 degrees-of-freedom, 1 Head with 3 degrees-of-freedom, 1 Tail with 1 degree-of-freedom	Mouth: 1 degree-of-freedom, Head: 3 degrees-of-freedom, Legs: 3 degrees-of-freedom (x4), Tail: 2 degrees-of-freedom	Mouth - 1 degree of freedom, Head - 3 degrees of freedom, Leg - 3 degrees of freedom x4 legs, Ear - 1 degree of freedom x2, Tail - 2 degrees of freedom	Head: 3-axes, Mouth: 1-axis, Neck: 1-axis, Waist: 1-axis, Legs: 3-axes x4, Ear: 1-axis x 2, Tail: 2-axes
Touch sensors	x4 Button sensors (one on each paw) x1 Pressure sensor (head)	x4 Button sensors (one on each paw) x1 Pressure sensor (head)	x4 Button sensors (one on each paw) Pressure sensor (head)	Pressure sensor (chin) x2 Electrostatic sensors (head, back) x4 Button sensors (One on each paw)	Pressure-based capacitive touch sensor (Head, chin, back)
Camera	362 × 492 CCD camera	180,000 pixels	180,000 pixel color CCD camera (x 1)	CMOS Image Sensor 350,000 pixels	Front camera, SLAM camera
Wireless LAN	N/A	N/A	N/A	IEEE 802.11b (Integrated)	IEEE 802.11b/g/n (Integrated)
Mobile connectivity	No	No	No	No	4G LTE
Range finders	N/A	N/A	Infra-red	One on head, one on body	Range sensor (chest)
Display	N/A	N/A	LED Lamps for expressing happiness (green) and anger (red)	Illume Face capable of over 60 emotional and status modes, consisting of 24 LEDs (white 12, red 4, blue 4, green 4), Ear: 2 (left & right), Head sensor : 2 (white and amber), Head (wireless LAN on/off): 1 (blue), Back sensor: 16 (white 8, red 3, blue 3, orange 2)	2 x OLED Eye Displays
Microphone	Stereo microphone	Stereo microphone	Stereo microphone (one on each side)	Stereo microphone (one on each side)	4 Microphones
Speaker	Yes	Yes	Yes	Miniature speaker, 20.8 mm、500 mW	Yes
Heat sensor	N/A	N/A	Yes, two	Yes	Yes
Acceleration sensor	Yes	N/A	Yes	Yes	Yes
Angular velocity sensor	N/A	N/A	Yes	N/A	Yes
Vibration sensor	N/A	N/A	N/A	Yes	N/A
Power source	Li-ion (7.2 V) for electric circuits Ni-Cd (4.8) for motor drivers	One 7.2 V rechargeable lithium-ion battery, one 4.8 V rechargeable nickel-cadmium battery	DC7.2 V (lithium-ion battery [ERA-110B])	7.4 V (2200 mAh) lithium-ion battery [ERA-7B]	4-cell lithium-ion battery ERA-1001B
Energy consumption	unknown	unknown	12.6 W (autonomous mode)	Approx. 7 W (standard operation in autonomous mode)	Approx. 14 W
Operating time (approx.)	unknown	unknown	1.5 hours default capacity, 2.5 hours with a re-celled battery	1.5 hours (standard / autonomous mode) 2.5 hours (higher capacity / autonomous mode)	Approx 2 hours
Charging time (approx.)	unknown	unknown	2.5 hours	2.5 hours	3 hours
Dimensions (L×W×H, without tail)	220 mm × 130 mm × 200 mm (8.7 in × 5.1 in × 7.9 in)	235 mm × 132 mm × 250 mm (not including tail)	Approx. 274 mm × 156 mm × 266 mm (not including tail)	319 mm × 180 mm × 278 mm	Approx. 180 mm × 293 mm × 305 mm (Standing posture not including protrusions)
Weight (approx)	1.5 kg (3.3 lb) (including batteries)	1.25 kg (including batteries)	About 1.4 kg (body), about 1.6 kg (including memory stick and battery)	Approx. 1.65 kg (including battery & memory stick)	2.2 kg (4.9 lb)

== Software ==
All AIBO models prior to the ERS-1000 were bundled with AIBOLife software, enabling the robot to walk, "see" its environment via camera, recognize spoken commands (English and Spanish, or Japanese), and develop a "personality". AIBO's sounds were programmed by Japanese DJ/avant-garde composer Nobukazu Takemura, fusing mechanical and organic concepts. The sounds and music in the ERS-7's Mind series of software were composed by Japanese musician and game designer Masaya Matsuura.

=== Aperios and Open-R ===
Aperios is Sony's Proprietary Real-Time Operating system, used in all AIBOs, QRIO and some other consumer devices. Aperios OS was intended to be widely deployed, using real-time capabilities to handle multiple audio and visual data streams concurrently. The operating system was not widely adopted, and by 2003 Sony had stopped active development with COO Kunitake Ando commenting "Aperios was an operating system of a pre-Internet age and we decided that it isn't adequate for the future".

The OPEN-R architecture is specific to entertainment robots. The architecture involves the use of modular hardware components, such as appendages that can be easily removed and replaced to change the shape and function of the robots, and modular software components that can be interchanged to change their behavior and movement patterns. AIBO's creator, Doi, called OPEN-R the "masterpiece" of the AIBO development project, arguing it would minimize the need for programming individual movements or responses, and its "open" nature would encourage a global community of robot specialists and programmers to add capability.

=== AIBOware ===
First and second generation models of AIBO can load different software packages sold by Sony. AIBOware (a trademark of Sony corporation) is the title given to the software the AIBO runs on its pink Memory Stick. Popular examples include:

The Life AIBOware: allows the robot to be raised from pup to fully grown adult while going through various stages of development as its owner interacts with it. Life 2 was later released, adding new features such as Owner Registration, allowing the AIBO to call its owner's name in its tonal language.

The Explorer AIBOware: allows the owner to interact with a fully mature robot able to understand (though not necessarily willing to obey) 100 voice commands.

Without AIBOware, AIBOs run in "clinic mode" and can only perform basic actions.

Third generation ERS-7 models have a sole "MIND" series of software that includes capabilities of AIBOLife and other AIBOware packages. MIND software also includes a docking process, allowing ERS-7s to recharge autonomously. Upgrades in MIND2 include the AIBO Entertainment Player, a Wi-Fi based connection to a PC, and upgrades in MIND3 include speech, blogging and autonomous room mapping. While each MIND revision was released alongside each ERS-7 revision (ie. MIND1 released alongside ERS-7M1, MIND2 released alongside ERS-7M2, etc.) any ERS-7 model is capable of running any revision of MIND software.

AIBO's complete vision system uses the scale-invariant feature transform (SIFT) algorithm to recognise its charging station. The vision system is an implementation of Evolution Robotics ERVision.

Notable AIBOware software

Name	Description	Supported Models
AIBO Life	Allows users to raise their Aibos from baby to adult.	ERS-2x0 and ERS-31x
Hello AIBO!	Allows users to begin with a "mature" AIBO, skipping the raising process.	ERS-11x, ERS-2x0, and ERS-31x
AIBO Custom Manager	Allows users to load MIND with different sounds, dance routines and voices.	ERS-7
AIBO Entertainment Player	Allows remote monitoring or control of AIBO MIND by a PC connected by WiFi.	ERS-7

Notable third-party software

Name	Description	Supported Models
DogsLife	An AIBO personality duplicating (and occasionally improving upon) Hello-AIBO.	Second-generation AIBOs
Skitter	AIBO "performance" editor, allowing users to create and cause AIBO to perform skits via a PC connected the AIBO by WiFi.	All
aiboplus	Replacement personality to explore new ways in the artificial intelligence.	ERS-7
AiboStella	iOS controller, patterned after AEP, using URBI framework	ERS-7, ERS-210, ERS-220
AIBO Control	Android controller, using URBI framework.	ERS-7

Free third-party software is available from providers such as Robot App Store.

=== AIBO Software Development Environment ===
Initially, access to programming capabilities was limited to Sony and organizations participating in Robocup. By reverse-engineering AIBO, users developed their own software that operated together with AIBOware such as "DiscoAibo" which made the robotic canine dance to music.

In a significant copyright milestone, Sony invoked the Digital Millennium Copyright Act in October 2001, and sent a cease-and-desist notice demanding that "Aibopet" stop distributing code that was retrieved by bypassing the copy protection mechanisms. In the face of complaints by many outraged AIBO owners, Sony backed down and subsequently released a programmer's kit for "non-commercial" use.

The kit was eventually expanded into three distinct tools: R-CODE, the OPEN-R SDK (software development kit) and the AIBO Remote Framework (ERS-7 only). These three tools are combined under the name AIBO Software Development Environment. R-CODE and AIBO Remote Framework were free to download and could be used for commercial or non-commercial purposes, while OPEN-R SDK is specifically for non-commercial use.

==== OPEN-R SDK ====
The OPEN-R SDK is a C++ based programming SDK, based on open-source tools (like gcc and newlib), that allows the creation of software for AIBO platforms. This SDK is considered low-level and allows control of everything from the gain values of AIBO's actuators to retrieving AIBO's camera data and performing computer vision computations. No pre-built "standard" AIBO functionality is provided, such as it is with R-Code and AIBO Remote Framework. It thus permits low-level robotic research.

==== R-CODE and R-CODE plus ====
R-Code is a high-level scripting language for AIBO, allowing creation of simple programs for an AIBO to execute. Remoting is possible via a simple WiFi terminal socket connection. Commercial usage is allowed, and the license fee is free.

R-CodePlus is a derivative of R-Code by AiboPet with several added functionalities. R-CodePlus is a superset of R-Code in terms of language, so everything written in standard R-Code will work on an R-CodePlus MemoryStick (for the same Model AIBO). R-CodePlus exposes new AIBO functions such as simple face recognition, name registration, and camera adjustment settings. In addition to the standard R-Code terminal socket for remoting, R-CodePlus supplies a "Telemetry" socket for several binary data transfers such as AIBO's camera image and sending/receiving sound.

Aibnet offers a development environment for R-Code programming.

Simplified drag-and-drop customizing of behavior is available via the user-created YART ("Yet Another RCode Tool").

==== AIBO Remote Framework ====
AIBO remote framework allows one to remotely access capabilities of AIBO MIND, including behaviors and pattern recognition, from a Windows PC. The same functionality is used in the AIBO Entertainment Player. The AIBO Remote Framework is a Windows PC API based on Visual C++. The Framework can be used to write code that can remotely control an AIBO running MIND2 or MIND3 Aiboware via a wireless LAN. Commercial usage is allowed, and the license fee is free.

=== Other Development Environments ===
Several robot software development frameworks have been developed that support AIBOs, including URBI, Tekkotsu, and Pyro.

=== Current Projects ===
AiBO+ is a replacement personality for the ERS-7. The project provides an AEP-like application (AiBO+ Client) to connect to the robot under Ubuntu Linux, Windows, Mac OS X, iOS, and Android. The owner can control the dog, play a game and see the robot state.

AIBO Control allows Android users to control AIBO ERS-7s running URBI.

The Open-R and GCC based toolchain has been updated by the community to use GCC 5.4, Binutils 2.24 and Newlib 1.15. This improvement brings the latest C++11/C++14 features and modern software to program the robot. The packaged version of the old and updated AIBO toolchain is available for Ubuntu in a PPA.

== AIBOs in education and academia ==
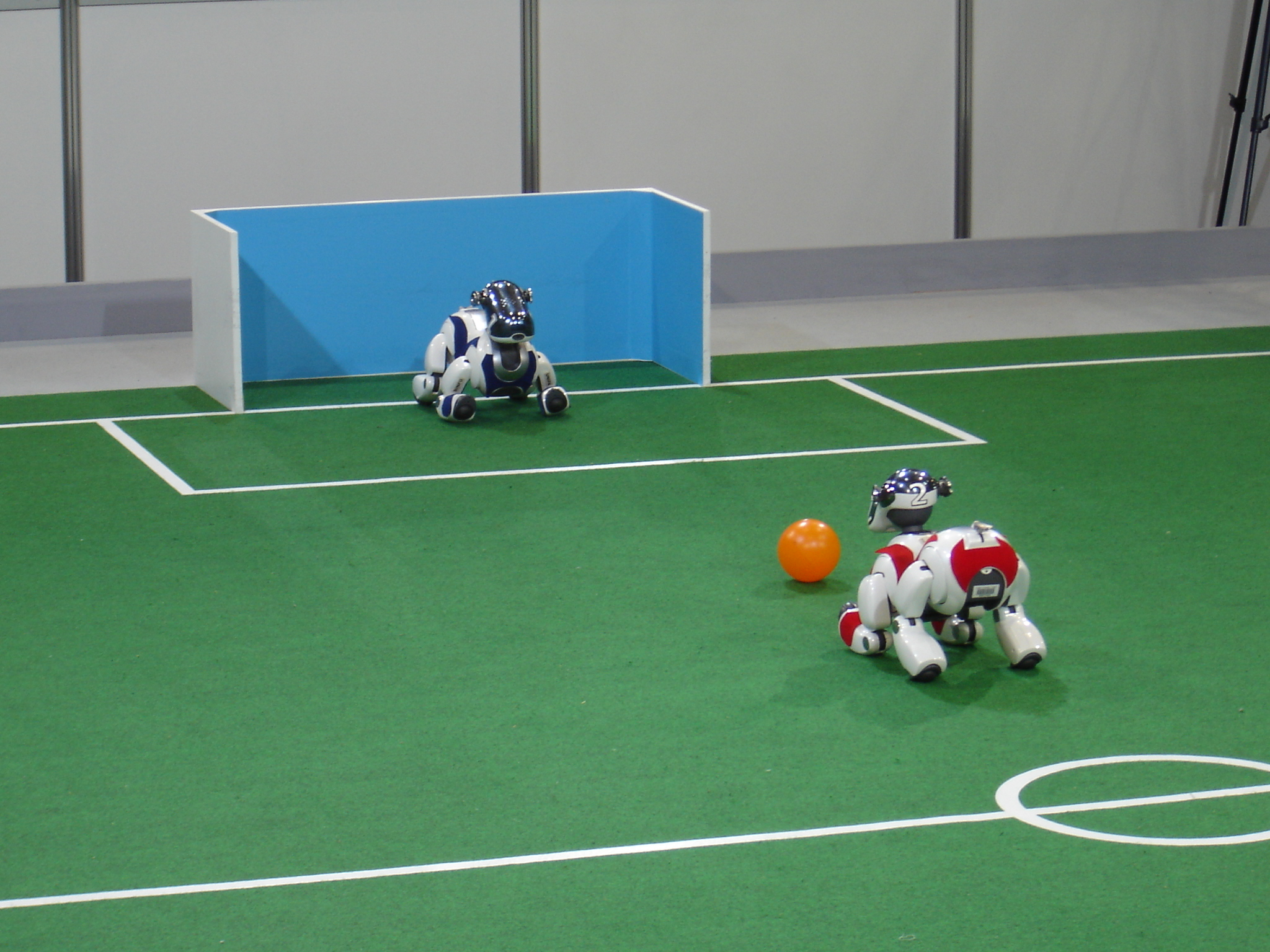
Penalty shootout

AIBOs were used extensively in education. For example, Carnegie Mellon offered an AIBO-centred robotics course covering models of perception, cognition, and action for solving problems. Robotbenchmark also features an online simulation challenge based on an AIBO ERS-7 model called "Visual Tracking".

=== RoboCup Four-Legged League ===
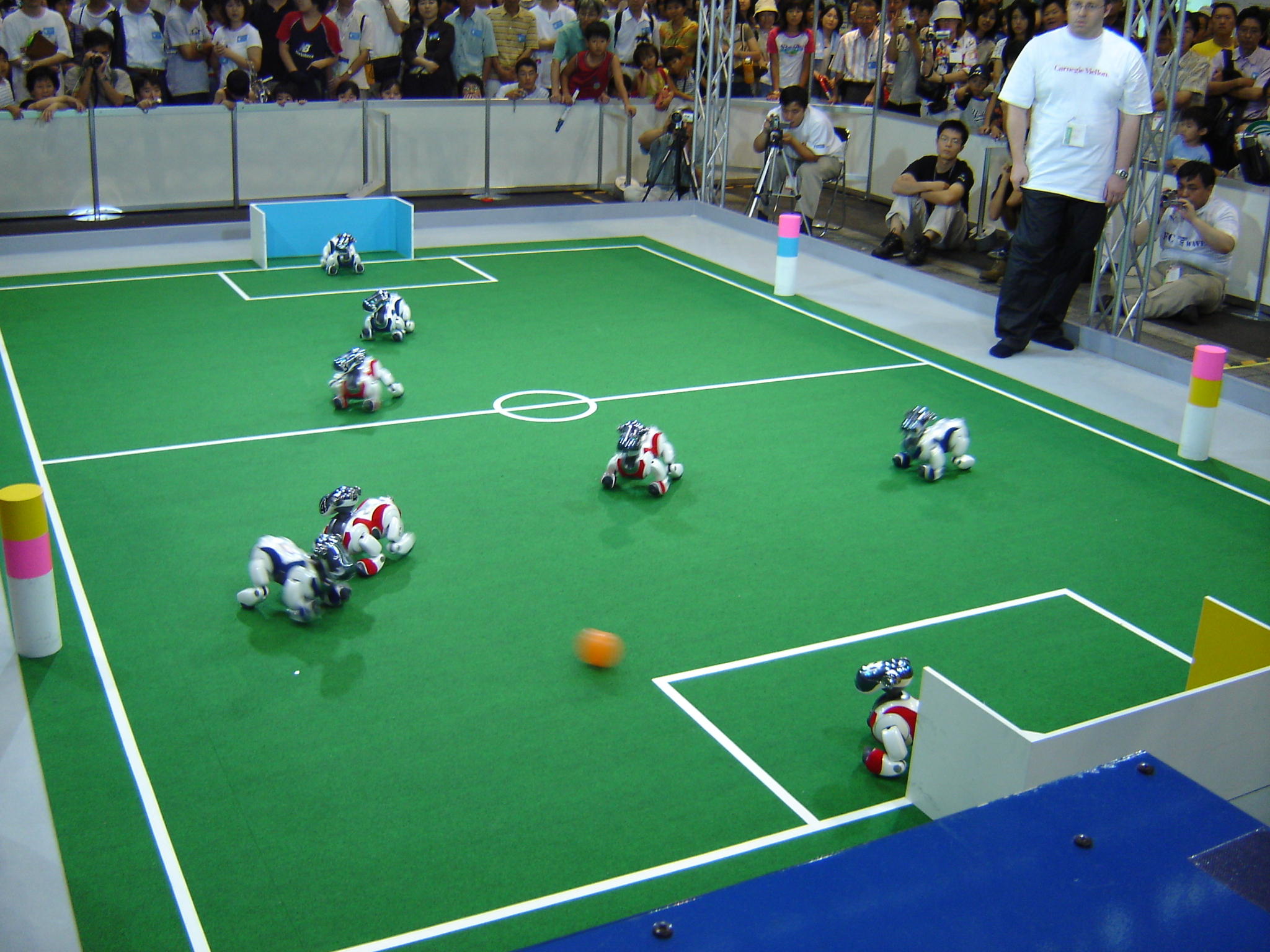
AIBO robots playing in the 9th RoboCup in Osaka (2005)

The AIBO has seen much use as an inexpensive platform for artificial intelligence education and research because it integrates a computer, vision system, and articulators in a package vastly cheaper than conventional research robots. One focal point for that development has been the Robocup Leagues.

The Four-Legged League was the initial name for the RoboCup Standard Platform League, a robot soccer league in which all teams compete with identical robots. The robots operate fully autonomously, with no external control by humans nor computers. The specific AIBO version changed over time: ERS-110 (1999–2000), ERS-210 (2001–2002), ERS-210A SuperCore (2003), ERS-7 (2004–2008). The replacement and current standard platform is the humanoid NAO by Aldebaran Robotics.

Sony provided AIBOs support and sponsorship to universities around the world to participate in the RoboCup autonomous soccer competition Four-Legged Robot Soccer League. Competing teams would program a team of AIBO robots to play games of autonomous robot soccer against other competing teams. The Four-Legged League ran from 1999 to 2008, although in the final year, many big-name universities did not compete as they had moved to the new NAO platform. The University of New South Wales was the most successful team in the League, making the final six times and winning three times.

== Conventions ==
=== International AIBO Convention ===
The International AIBO Convention takes place every year at Sony Robotics Tower in the Shinjuku prefecture of Tokyo, Japan. The first convention took place on 15 May 1999. It was then set to 2–4 May. The 2009 convention, being in its tenth year, set attendance records. The convention usually features AIBO advertisements, free posters, free accessories, freeware/open-source downloads and AIBO demonstrations.

=== AIBO Orlando events ===
Since 2019, independent organizers have hosted small, fan-oriented gatherings at various locations in Orlando, Florida. The 2020 AIBO Orlando event was cancelled due to the COVID-19 pandemic, but resumed in 2021. These events typically last two days. The next AIBO Orlando event is scheduled to be held on February 20–21, 2027. (Note: This event was originally scheduled to be held in September 2026, but was postponed to February 2027 for unknown reasons.)

== In popular culture ==
When AIBO was introduced, The New Yorker published a cartoon by Jack Ziegler showing AIBO "urinating" nuts and bolts on a fire hydrant.

The AIBO ERS-111 was used in Janet Jackson's "Doesn't Really Matter" music video, and received increased market demand and commercial success after being featured with Jackson in the clip.

The AIBO ERS-311 was featured in the Swedish girl group Play's music video for their song "Us Against The World".

In an episode of Frasier, Frasier gives his dad an AIBO ERS-210 to keep him company while he is visiting Roz in Wisconsin. There is a scene with Eddie interacting with the AIBO, while Martin Crane complains to Sony about not being able to get it to work.

In the film Click, Kevin's new Robo-dog an AIBO ERS-7, was run over by the dad's car.

A pair of robotic dogs based on AIBO appear in Tokyo Jungle, a video game published by Sony Computer Entertainment. The very first AIBO model, ERS-110, is seen in this game, too.

An AIBO ERS-210 can be seen in the title sequence of the 2017 TV adaptation of Neil Gaiman's American Gods.

The AIBO ERS-110 and ERS-1000 models also appear in the 2024 Team Asobi-developed video game Astro Bot.

The ERS-1000 model joined Fortnite: Battle Royale in November 2026.

=== Animation ===
The AIBO television series Piroppo (ピロッポ) was a series of animated shorts (approximately 6 minutes each) based around AIBO ERS-31xes, Latte and Macaron. The animated series triggered sounds and actions from viewers' ERS-31xes in media-link mode on the proper software. The 23-episode series was broadcast on Fuji TV from 11 October 2001, to 21 March 2002.

An AIBO ERS-1000 and ERS-111 appears in Kamen Rider Zero-One, from episodes 38, 39 and 45 respectively, as Gai Amatsu's AI dog named Thouser. Between July 19 and August 2, 2020, owners of fifth generation AIBO received a limited-time update that will allow to perform a special dance as seen in the 39th episode.

In the Futurama episode "Jurassic Bark", Bender is seen with a robotic dog resembling an AIBO named Robo-Puppy.

== See also ==
- Cindy Smart
- Genibo
- i-Cybie
- Musio
- QRIO
- Robot app store
- Furby
