= Intel Play =

Product line of toy electronic devices

The Intel Play product line, developed and jointly marketed by Intel and Mattel, is a discontinued product line of consumer "toy" electronic devices. The other toys were the Digital Movie Creator, the Computer Sound Morpher, and the Me2Cam. The line was launched in the fall of 1999.

The Intel Play product line was discontinued on March 29, 2002, when it was purchased by Tim Hall's holding company Prime Entertainment. Hall founded Digital Blue, which continued the Intel Play product line under the Digital Blue brand. The "Play" logo of Intel Play became a staple of 2K Play in 2007.

== QX3 Computer Microscope ==
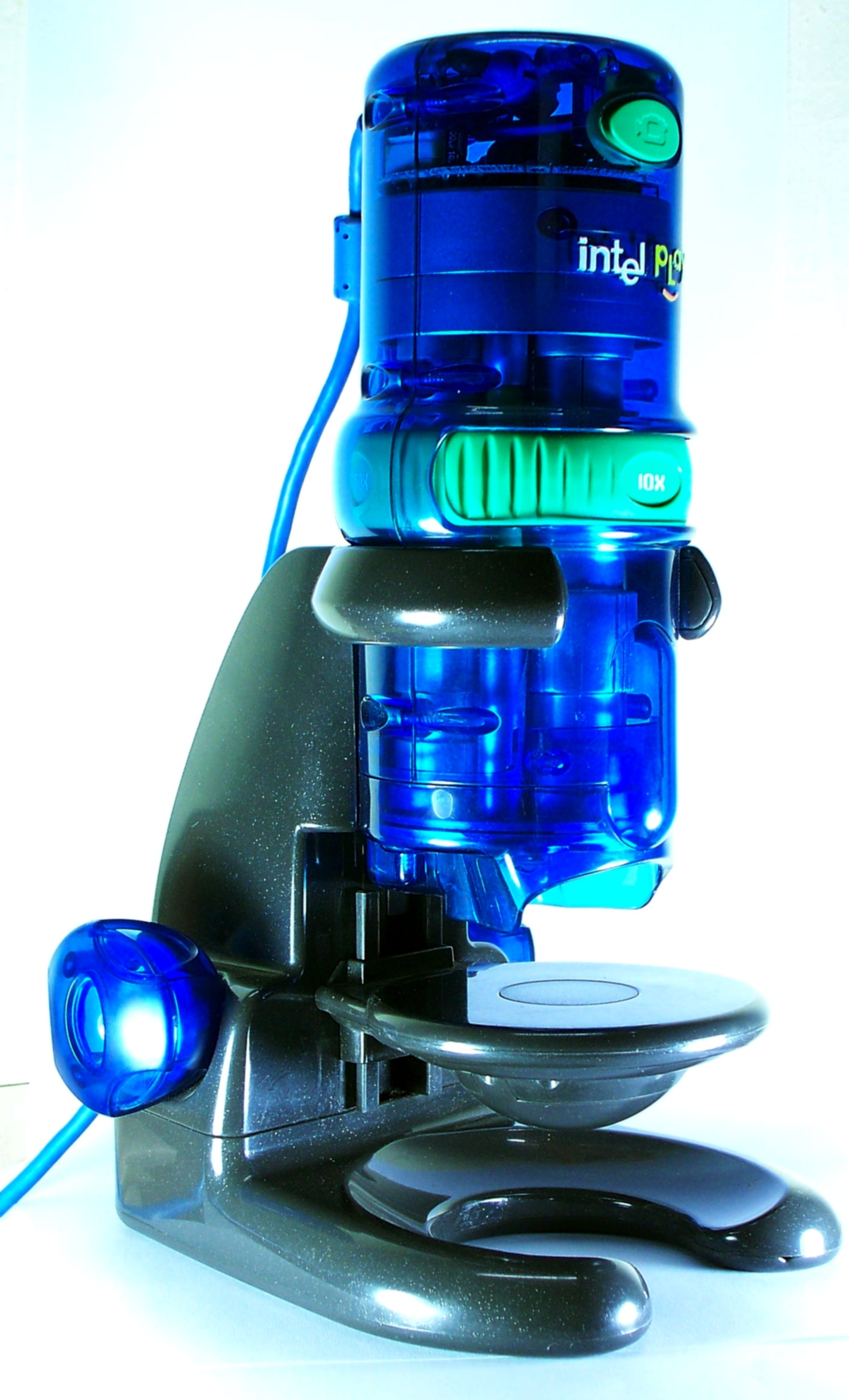
Intel Play QX3 Microscope

The QX3 Computer Microscope was a product in the Intel Play product line and was continued in the Digital Blue product line. An upgraded QX5 model was available.

The QX3 is a small, semi-transparent blue electronic microscope that can connect to a computer via a USB connection. It has magnification levels of 10x, 60x, and 200x. The microscope comes with software which allows a computer to access the microscope and use it to either take pictures or record movie. The specimen can be lit either from underneath or from above by one of two incandescent bulbs (3.5V, 300mA). The specimen platform is adjustable to focus the image. The Vision CPiA (VV0670P001) is interfaced to a CIF CCD sensor, sampled at a resolution of 320x240 pixels.

== QX5 Computer Microscope ==
The QX5 Computer Microscope is a Digital Blue product and upgraded the QX3 with multiple improvements, including a 640x480 image capture device and a brighter light source.

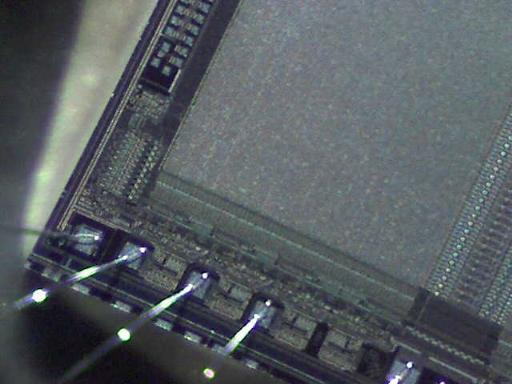
EPROM. 60x Closeup with Qx5.

== Digital Movie Creator ==
The Digital Movie Creator was a product in the Intel Play product line and was continued in the Digital Blue product line. The upgraded 2.0 and 3.0 was available. Intel Play Digital Movie Creator is featured as an easy-to-use digital video camera and movie-making software package that allows children to use the PC to script and star in their own feature movies. At the time of development and release in 2001, the goal of the Intel Play products is to extend the value and utility of powerful PCs, like ones based on the Pentium 4 processor.

== Computer Sound Morpher ==
Intel Play Computer Sound Morpher and Editing CD-ROM was another product of the Intel Play line intended for children of 6 years and older to record and subsequently edit sounds on a computer in "fun and surprising ways." It featured a variety of pre-recorded sounds to choose from, and audio filters such as "echo" and "ballpark." Users of the program could then share sounds through means such as e-mail.

== Me2Cam ==
The Intel Play Me2Cam Computer Video Camera was a digital video camera that plugs into a computer via a USB port connection. A CD-ROM that comes with the camera uses image processing to remove the background from the subject and overlay the subject onto an external background from the 5 games included. It also features the ability to use body movements to control actions in the games.
