= Play value =

Essential value of a toy or game

Play value is the essential value of a toy or game for play. The term is frequently employed in the field of child development and playwork for the assessment of toys, games, equipment and spaces. When they are fun and engaging, playthings and spaces are said to have play value; those that are quickly discarded or are considered uninteresting do not. In short, objects of play must be compelling and encourage the child's involvement in order to have true play value. Play value has been defined as 'how much play can you get out of something'. Classic toys are examples of toys with true play value as they continue to provide new discoveries and adventures in each subsequent session of play.

== Assessment of play value in the selection of toys and games ==
The selection of toys and games has long been a concern to parents and educators. Many fail to sufficiently engage children. Stevanne Auerbach emphasizes that products should last as long as possible and have many different and long lasting uses. Good examples of toys with high play value are blocks, construction toys and yo-yos. The toy should have clear instructions so the parent and child are guided to its best use by the designer and manufacturer. In playwork terms it is the child who determines the play value of an object rather than adults or instruction manuals

== Multiple uses ==
Toys tend to have high play value when they may be used, engaged and employed in manifold ways. A good example is Lego bricks which may be assembled and connected in myriad ways to make cars, trucks, planes, trains, etc. Another good example is polymer clay which may be used for sculpting hand-shaped items, such as beads, jewelry, and charms.

== Self-directed play ==
Children need to be in charge of their own play activity. According to PBS' The Whole Child Web site when adults plan the play activity and structure the outcome of playtime it is far less effective than if children have the freedom to form their own ideas, practice skills and use playthings at their own speed. Cardboard box toys are an example of playthings which allow children to use their own imaginations.

== Appeal to more than one age or stage of development ==
Playability is a word that when applied to games has a similar meaning to play value. Those games with strong playability appeal to more than one age or stage of development. For example, Monopoly and Risk are two games that appeal to a wide range of ages, though generally not to very young children. Similarly, toys that appeal to more than one age or stage tend to have higher play value.

== Inverse relationship with linkage to TV, movies and video games ==
Authors Nancy Carlsson-Paige & Diane Levin note that play value in toys can be seen as inversely related to their degree of linkage with TV, movies and video games. For example, G.I. Joe, Teenage Mutant Ninja Turtles, and Power Rangers are all examples of toys that have cross-feeds with television shows that have violent themes. Similarly, Godzilla, Small Soldiers, Spawn, Jurassic Park and Starship Troopers toys are marketed to children 4 and up.

== Complement or supplement other play activities ==
Computer games or electronic toys are examples of toys that can complement or supplement other play activities. According to author Cathrine Neilsen-Hewett, while often stimulating, engaging and fun, these toys should never become a substitute for traditional play activities such as drawing, pretending, or block building. Instead, electronic games are best thought of as adding to or reinforcing other kinds of play, and are not a suitable replacement for parental interaction and attention.

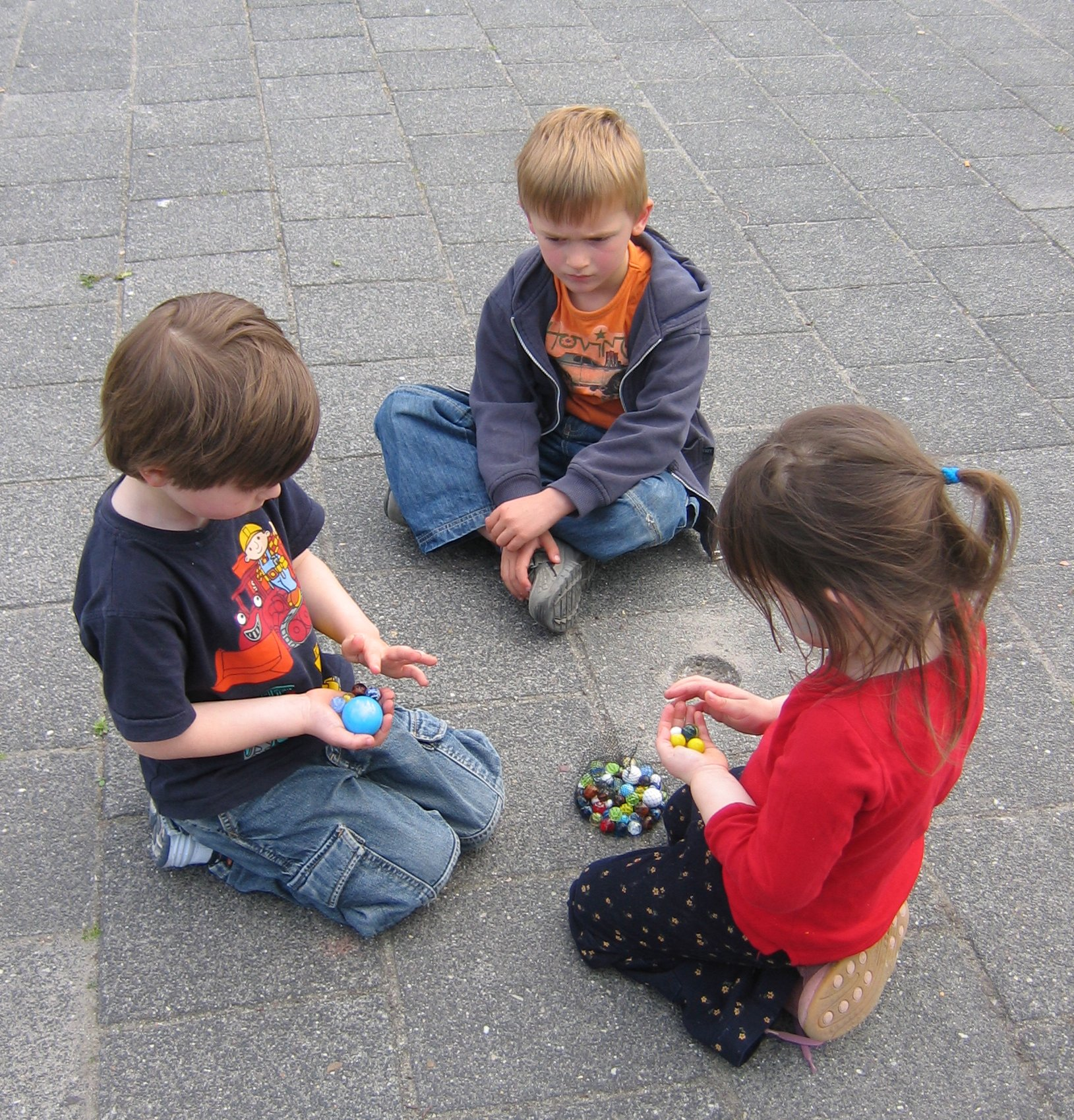
Children playing with marbles

== Stay with children as they develop ==
Classic toys such as Mr. Potato Head, the Radio Flyer wagon and Chutes and Ladders or in a general sense, spanning generations, the teddy bear, stay with a child as they develop new interests and matures. These toys "stand the test of time", and can accompany a child into more and more elaborate play when social surroundings, life and a knowledge of history create diversified and extended ideas.

Organized toy kingdoms can grow up in the rooms of European children. Named stuffed animals or dolls often occupy lifelong positions of honor, as visualized imaginary friends, in the lifetimes of sociable people with many real friends.

== Promote respectful interaction ==
Toys have greater play value that promote respectful, non-violent and non-stereotyped interaction among children. For example, Barbie is an example of a toy that reinforces gender stereotypes for girls despite its status as a classic toy.

== Useful for further learning ==
Play value from a child development perspective is enhanced by toys and games that help children develop skills useful for further learning and mastery such as Scrabble and The Game of Life In playwork terms - play value is the individual child's subjective assessment of the space and the equipment available to them, rather than a pre-conceived adult idea about what sorts of play are 'valuable'. 'Play value' and 'the value of play' are two separate judgements in playwork - the former chiefly made by children, and the latter chiefly made by adults.

== See also ==
- Play (activity)
- Play therapy
