= Sam and Nia =

American YouTubers and vloggers

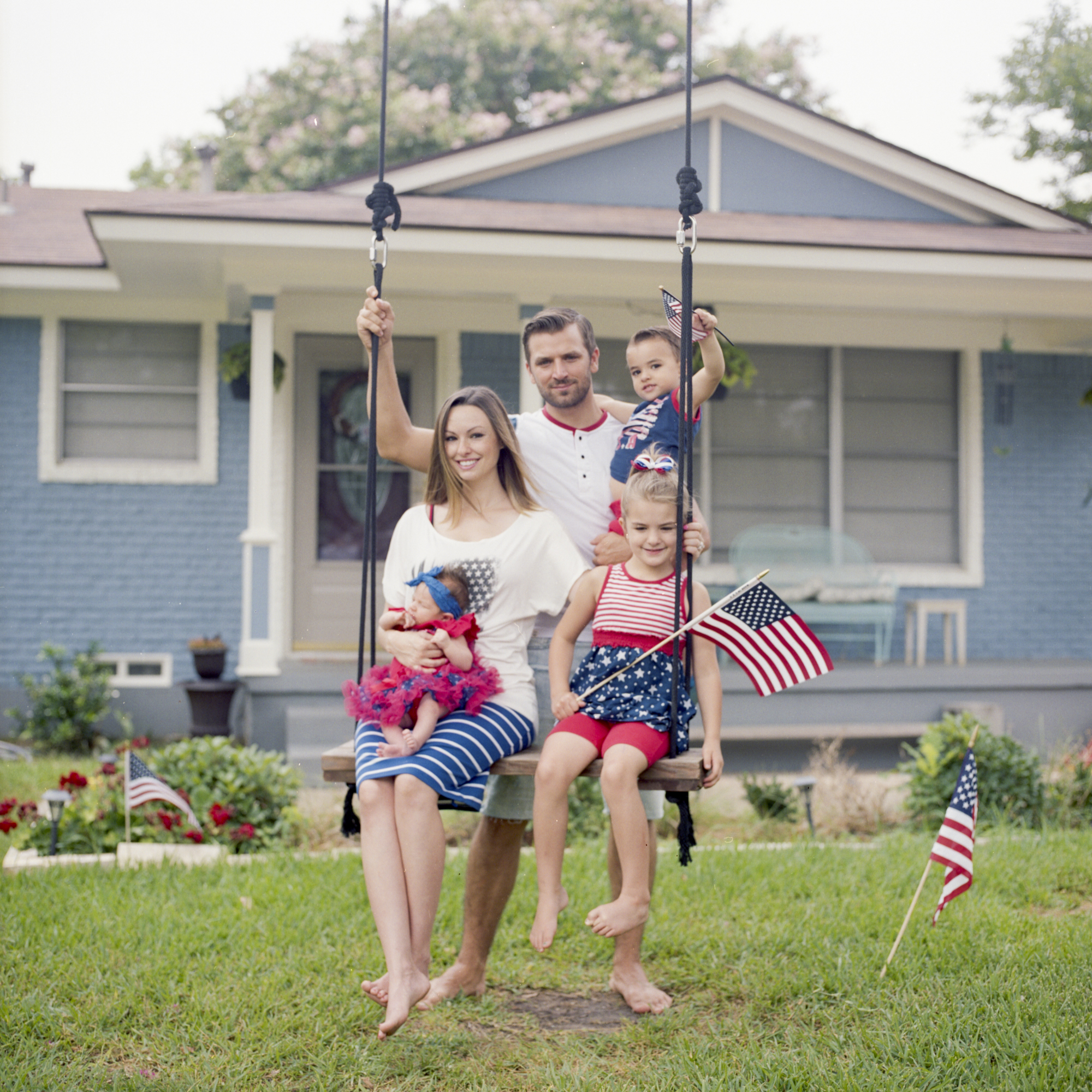
- Nia and Sam Rader with their children in 2016
- Born: Samuel Paul Rader; October 26, 1985 (age 40); NiaChel Jonique Rader (née Rand); September 2, 1988 (age 38)
- Occupation: YouTube vloggers
- Children: 4

YouTube information
- Channel: Sam and Nia
- Years active: 2014–present
- Genre: Vlog
- Subscribers: 2.49 million
- Views: 1.12 billion
- Last updated: 14 April 2026
- Website: samandnia.com

Sam and Nia are YouTube vloggers based in Terrell, Texas, who vlog about their daily life as a Christian family. They made a video of themselves lip-syncing the song "Love Is an Open Door" from Frozen in March 2014 which became viral.

In August 2015, Sam and Nia released a controversial viral video of Sam surprising Nia with her own pregnancy. A few days later, they announced that their pregnancy ended in a miscarriage, and a few days after that, Sam was exposed in the Ashley Madison data breach.

== Personal history ==
Samuel Paul Rader was born October 26, 1985, and NiaChel "Nia" Jonique Rand was born September 2, 1988. Sam and Nia dated for nearly five years until they married on September 12, 2009. The couple have four children.

Both received associate degrees from Trinity Valley Community College, while Sam also earned a Bachelor of Science in Nursing from the University of Texas at Arlington. For the first few years of their marriage, Sam worked as an emergency room nurse while Nia worked at a Maurices clothing store.

== YouTube history ==
On March 10, 2014, Sam uploaded a video titled "Good Looking Parents Sing Disney's Frozen (Love Is an Open Door)". The video was picked up by news stations and websites all over the world and quickly became a viral video. The video has amassed over 22 million views. The video's success greatly increased the number of subscribers to their YouTube channel. Within one month, they had over 35,000 subscribers.

In June 2015, Sam uploaded a video of him surprising his wife with her own pregnancy by dipping a pregnancy test into a toilet bowl with her urine in it on a morning she did not flush it. It was immediately picked up by the media and went viral. Within two days, it had over 5 million views and currently has 19 million views. The video caused a fair amount of controversy, including Vanity Fair and Mic questioning whether a man had the right to know a woman was pregnant before she knew herself. To dispute the claims made by Sam and Nia in their video, BuzzFeed interviewed a doctor and published an article casting doubt on the ability to get a positive pregnancy test result from toilet bowl water.

Three days after the pregnancy announcement video, Sam and Nia released another video (which has since been removed) announcing that their pregnancy had ended in a miscarriage. This announcement received mixed reactions. Articles and videos were made to support them, and others were made doubting the authenticity of their claims. Sam admitted that Nia had not gone to a doctor to be looked at; he said it was unnecessary because he was a registered nurse and already knew how to handle the situation. This created even more doubt. Sam and Nia have insisted that they were sincere in their pregnancy and miscarriage videos. Sam and Nia have also insisted that they do not regret announcing the pregnancy so early, with Sam saying, "the video and miscarriage were part of God’s plan".

In August 2015, Sam was thrown out of a vlogging convention in Seattle after getting into a physical altercation with another Christian vlogger. Later that year, Sam and Nia were named by The Daily Dot in the top five most influential YouTubers of 2015.

=== Ashley Madison ===
In 2015, three days after Sam and Nia announced they had a miscarriage, it was revealed that Sam had an account on the affair website Ashley Madison three years prior. Many major news websites and magazines picked up the story, including BuzzFeed, Cosmopolitan, and Perez Hilton. Two days later, Sam, with Nia by his side, released a video (which has since been removed) acknowledging and apologizing for having the account and said that God and Nia had forgiven him. This video caused further controversy and criticism, yet their subscriber count grew greatly. The couple took a hiatus from vlogging for 33 days before returning — though not daily as they had before.

Initially, while Sam acknowledged that he did have an Ashley Madison account, he insisted he never met up with anyone or cheated on his wife. However, in 2024, in the Netflix documentary Ashley Madison: Sex, Lies & Scandal, Sam said he lied and had cheated on his wife throughout their marriage, including using massage parlors and strip clubs, as well as engaging in two emotional relationships with the couple's acquaintances.

== Filmography ==
Year(s)	Show or Music Video	Role	Producer	Ref(s)
2014	In Summer (from "Frozen")	Sam Rader - the bus driver & male teacher Nia Rader - a lunch lady & female teacher	Disney Music Group	
2014	Good Looking Parents Sing Frozen, Again... (Love is an open door)	Sam Rader - himself Nia Rader - herself	YouTube Music Awards	
2015	Nightline, Quest For Clicks (Interview)	Sam Rader - himself Nia Rader - herself	ABC News	
2020	Sam and Nia	Sam Rader - himself Nia Rader - herself	Pinnacle Peak Pictures LLC	
2024	Ashley Madison: Sex, Lies & Scandal	Sam Rader - himself Nia Rader - herself	Minnow Films, Netflix	
