= Museum of Failure =

International exhibition of failed products and services

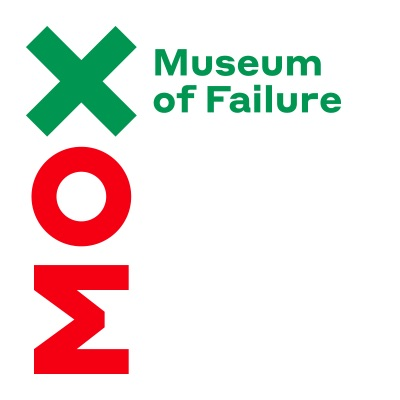
- Museum of Failure logo
- Established: June 7, 2017
- Location: Touring exhibition
- Type: Museum of failed products and services
- Collections: Over 150 failed products and services
- Founder: Samuel West
- Curator: Samuel West
- Website: museumoffailure.com

The Museum of Failure is a museum that features a collection of failed products and services. The touring exhibition provides visitors with a learning experience about the critical role of failure in innovation. According to its founder, Samuel West, the goal of the museum is to help people recognize the "need to accept failure if we want progress", and to encourage companies to learn more from their failures without resorting to "cliches".

== History ==
West's 2016 visit to the Museum of Broken Relationships in Zagreb inspired the concept of the museum. Museum founder and curator Samuel West reportedly registered a domain name for the museum and later realized he had misspelled the word museum. The Swedish Innovation Authority (Vinnova) partially funded the museum.

The one-room exhibition opened on 7 June 2017 in Helsingborg, Sweden, closing 15 September 2017.

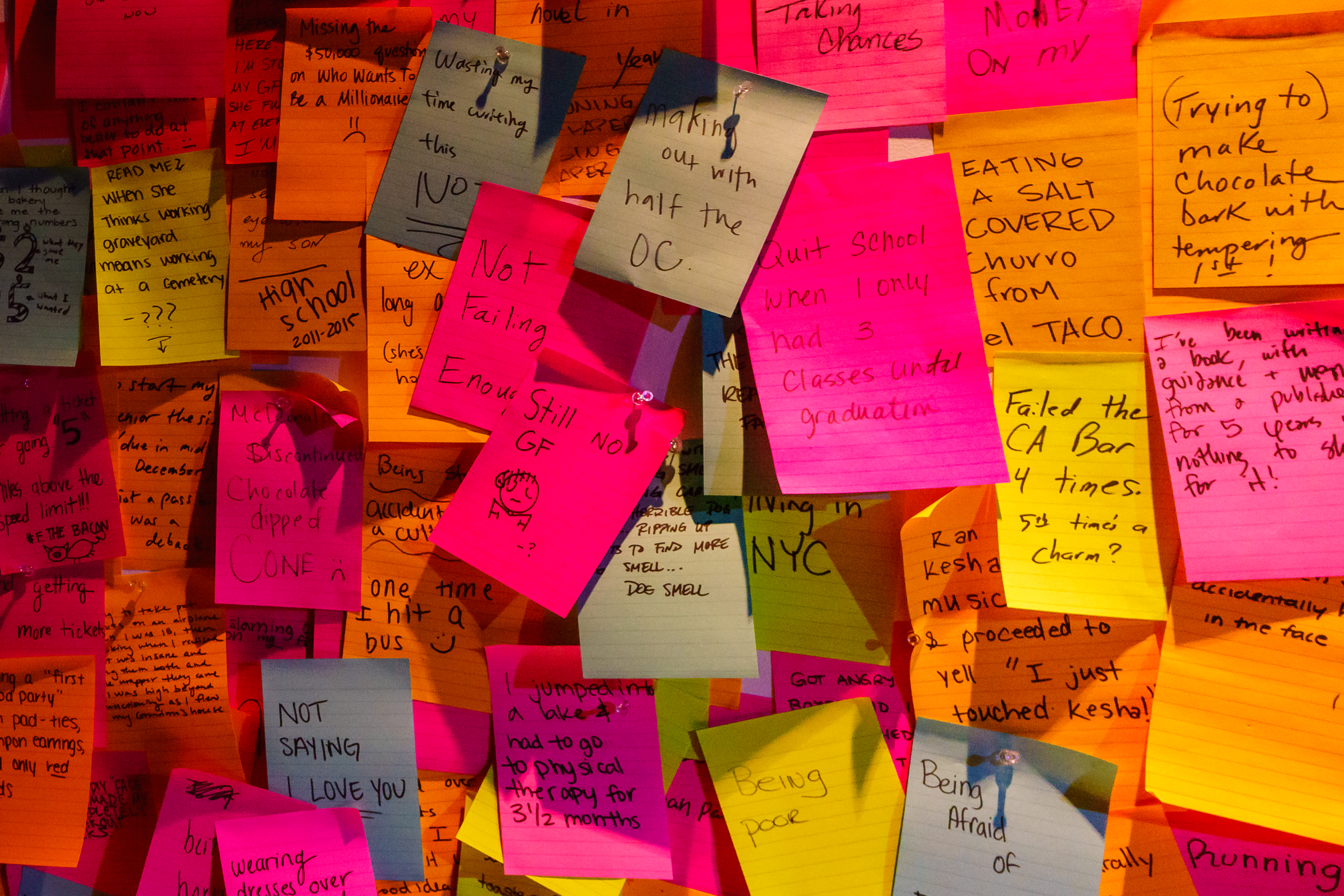
Visitors' comments in the exhibit in Los Angeles

In December 2017, a temporary exhibit opened in Los Angeles, on Hollywood Boulevard in the Hollywood & Highland Center. In June 2018, it reopened at Dunkers Kulturhus in Helsingborg, Sweden, before closing in January 2019. In January 2019, the exhibit opened at Shanghai, No.1 Center (上海第一百货), before closing in March 2019. In December 2019, a smaller version opened in Paris, France at the Cité des Sciences et de l'Industrie along with other interesting failure-related exhibitions for the "Festival of Failures" (Les Foirés festival des flops, des bides, des ratés et des inutiles).

== Collection ==
The collection consists of over 150 failed products and services worldwide. Some examples of the items on display include the Apple Newton, an Edsel, Bic for Her, Google Glass, N-Gage, lobotomy instruments, Harley-Davidson Cologne, Kodak DC-40, Sony Betamax, Lego Fiber Optics, a Tesla Cybertruck, the My Friend Cayla talking doll, and Coca-Cola BlāK.

The museum's package of Colgate lasagna is a replica since the company refused to send a real package of the short-lived 1960s product. In May 2020, the museum made most of the collection of artifacts available for viewing on its website.

== See also ==
- Fail fast (business)
- Museum of Broken Relationships
- Museum of Bad Art
- Museum of Particularly Bad Art
