= Troy Hunt =

Australian web security expert

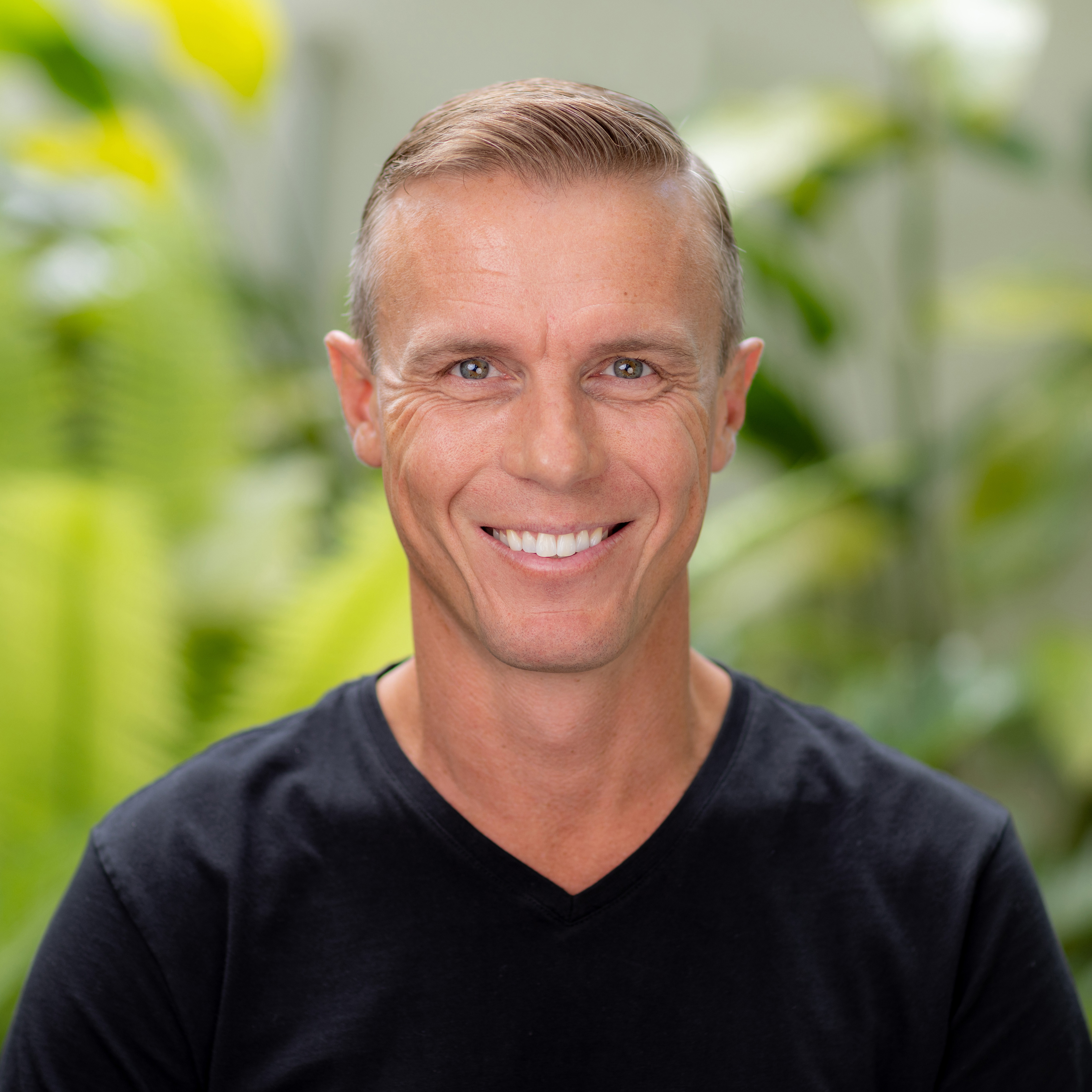
- Hunt in 2021
- Born: Troy Adam Hunt; 1976 (age 49–50)
- Known for: Have I Been Pwned?
- Spouses: Kylie Bragg (m. 2006; div. 2020) Charlotte Hunt (m. 2022)
- Awards: See Awards and achievements
- Website: www.troyhunt.com

Troy Adam Hunt is an Australian web security consultant known for public education and outreach on security topics. He created and operates Have I Been Pwned?, a data breach search website that allows users to see if their personal information has been compromised. He has also authored several popular security-related courses on Pluralsight, and regularly presents keynotes and workshops on security topics. He created ASafaWeb, a tool that formerly performed automated security analysis on ASP.NET websites.

== Data breaches ==
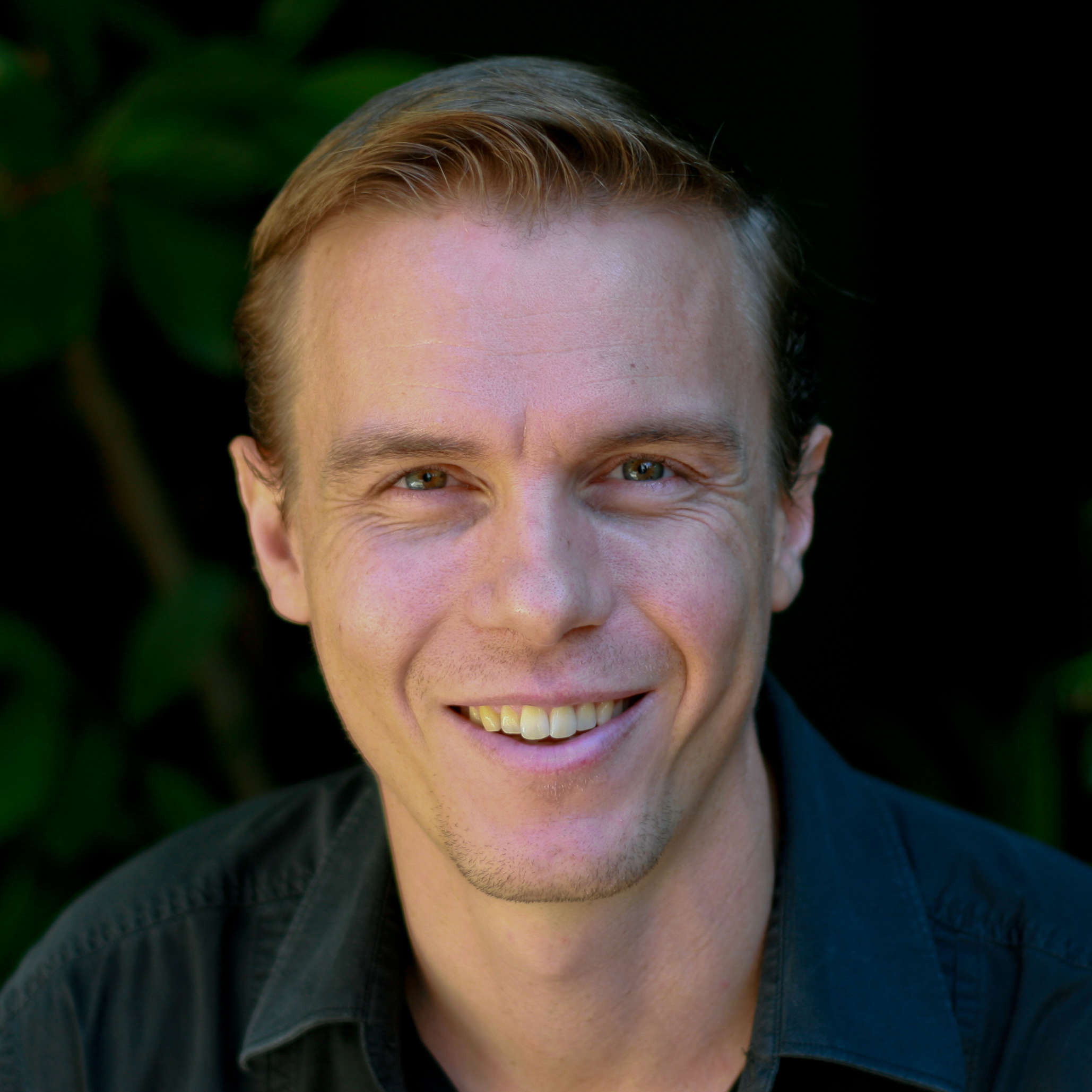
Hunt in 2010

As part of his work administering the Have I Been Pwned? (HIBP) website, Hunt has been involved in the publication of 644 data breaches as of 6 January 2023, and journalists cite him as a cybersecurity expert and data-breach expert.

As of June 2018, HIBP had recorded more than 5 billion compromised user-accounts. Governments of Australia, United Kingdom and Spain use the service to monitor their official domains. Popular services, such as 1Password, Eve Online, Okta and Kogan, have integrated HIBP into their account-verification process.

Gizmodo included HIBP in its October 2018 list of "100 Websites That Shaped the Internet as We Know It".

In August 2015, following the Ashley Madison data breach, Hunt received many emails from Ashley Madison members asking for help. He criticized the company for doing a poor job informing its userbase.

In February 2016 children's toy-maker VTech, who had suffered a major data breach months earlier, updated its terms of service to absolve itself of wrongdoing in the event of future breaches. Hunt, who had added the data from VTech's breach to the databases of Have I Been Pwned?, published a blog post harshly criticizing VTech's new policy, calling it "grossly negligent". He later removed the VTech breach from the database, stating that only two people besides himself had access to the data and wishing to reduce the chance of its spread.

In February 2017 Hunt published details of vulnerabilities in the Internet-connected children's toy, CloudPets, which had allowed access to 820,000 user records as well as 2.2 million audio files belonging to those users.

In November 2017 Hunt testified before the United States House Committee on Energy and Commerce about the impact of data breaches.

Also in November 2017 Hunt joined Report URI, a project (launched in 2015 by Scott Helme) which allows real-time monitoring of CSP and HPKP violations on a website. He planned to bring funding and his expertise to the project.

=== Personal data breach ===
On 24th March 2025, Hunt was targeted via a simple phishing campaign that hijacked his Mailchimp credentials. Over 16,000 email addresses were stolen, including data associated with the Email addresses, such as geolocation and IP addresses. Hunt discovered that his credentials were stolen after clicking on the phishing email which falsely stated that his account was restricted due to reports of spam, and he was required to login to review the details. Hunt wrote on his website that "Tiredness, was a major factor. I wasn't alert enough, and I didn't properly think through what I was doing". Troy Hunt published the stolen emails on his own platform, Have I been pwned?

=== Education ===
Hunt is known for his efforts in security education for computer and IT professionals. He has created several dozen courses on Pluralsight, an online education and training website for computer and creative professionals. He is one of the primary course authors for Pluralsight's Ethical Hacking path, a collection of courses designed for the Certified Ethical Hacker certification.

Additionally, Hunt works in education by speaking at technology conferences and running workshops. His primary workshop, titled Hack Yourself First, aims to teach software developers with little security background how to defend their applications by looking at them from an attacker's perspective.

== Awards and achievements ==
- 2011–present: Microsoft MVP for Developer Security
- 2016–present: Microsoft Regional Director
- 2018: AusCERT's Individual Excellence in Information Security award
- 2018: Grand Prix Prize for the Best Overall Security Blog, The European Security Blogger Award
