= Noel Biderman =

Canadian internet entrepreneur and business marketing specialist

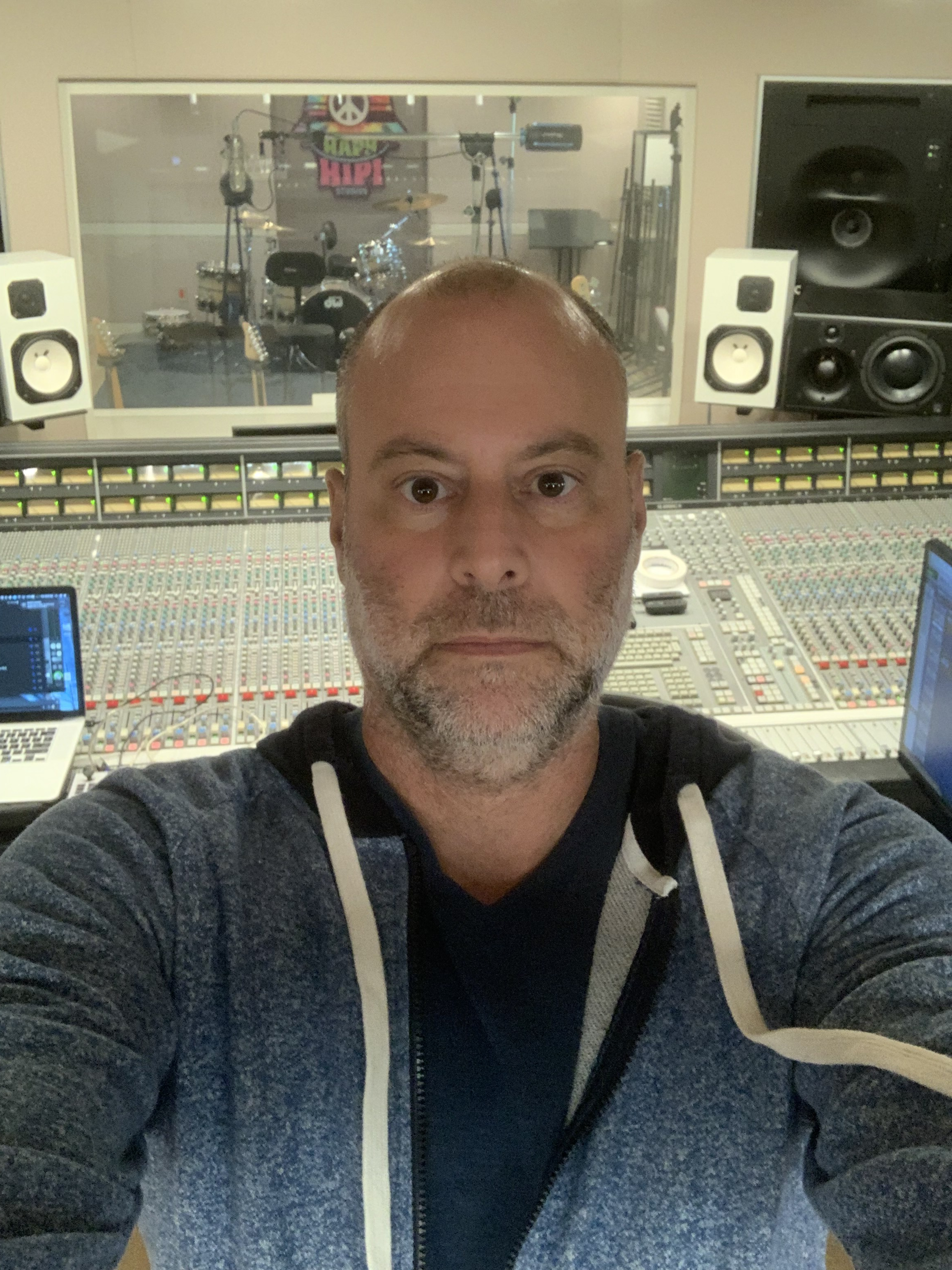
- Noel at work in 2022
- Born: 1971 (age 54–55)
- Education: University of California; Osgoode Hall Law School
- Occupation: Internet entrepreneur
- Website: noelbiderman.com

Noel Biderman (born 24 November 1971) is a Canadian former lawyer, sports agent and internet entrepreneur.

He gained prominence as the CEO of Avid Life Media and its subsidiary, Ashley Madison.

Currently, Biderman sits on the Board of Directors of WonderFi Technologies Inc., a public company on the Toronto Stock Exchange.

== Early life and education ==
He is a native of Toronto, Ontario. He was born Jewish and had a bar mitzvah ceremony. His grandparents were Holocaust survivors. Growing up in Toronto, he attended the York Mills Collegiate Institute in 1986, University of California, Los Angeles (economics) in 1989, and in 1996 graduated from York University's Osgoode Hall Law School.

== Career ==
Biderman began working at Interperformances Inc., a sports management agency, in 1997 and later became director of its Canadian operations. In 2000, he joined Homestores Inc. (now Move, Inc.) as general manager of Canadian operations.

In December 2005, Biderman became head of product development and marketing at JumpTV, an internet television broadcaster.

In 2007, he was appointed chief executive officer of Avid Life Media, the parent company of Ashley Madison, a dating website marketed to people seeking extramarital relationships. As the company’s public spokesperson, he defended the service in media interviews, stating that it did not promote infidelity but provided a platform for those already inclined toward such relationships. The site’s advertising, some of which he helped create, attracted attention for its explicit themes — such as television spots featuring couples “married... but not to each other” — and for targeting married women as potential users.

In July 2015, Ashley Madison experienced a data breach in which personal information of millions of users was published online. Hackers accused the company of failing to delete user data despite charging a fee for account removal, and the breach also led to the release of Biderman’s emails. On August 28, 2015, Avid Life Media announced his resignation as CEO.

Outside his business career, Biderman has coached youth basketball, volleyball, and football. In 2012, he led two Metro Toronto Wildcats TAP teams to provincial championships, and in 2013, he coached the North Toronto Huskies basketball team alongside the commissioner of the Canadian Football League, earning provincial bronze and silver medals.

After leaving Ashley Madison, Biderman became CEO of Avenue Insights, a Toronto-based software company that develops data collection tools for small and mid-sized organizations. He has also served as an adviser to companies in sectors including legal technology and online dating. In 2024, he appeared in the Netflix documentary Ashley Madison: Sex, Lies & Scandal, which examines the site’s history and aftermath. He is a member of the board of directors of WonderFi Technologies Inc., a publicly traded Canadian company.

=== Media appearances ===
Biderman has appeared on The Tyra Banks Show, The View, Larry King Live, GluckRadio, and Rogers TV's Daytime York Region. Biderman also served as a judge for the Miss Tiger Woods mistress pageant on The Howard Stern Show, which was sponsored by Ashley Madison.

In an interview with comedian Amy Schumer, Biderman stated that wives gaining weight "is a legitimate reason" for husbands to seek sex outside their marriages. He told Australia's A Current Affair program that if he found out that his own wife was accessing his cheater's site, "I would be devastated."

=== Speech and publication ===
He authored Cheaters Prosper: How Infidelity Will Save the Modern Marriage, SmartCountry (fiction), and Adultropology (non-fiction). He has spoken at TEDx and participated in a debate on family values at Fellowship Church.

=== Personal life ===
Noel Biderman is Jewish, as stated in multiple interviews. He is the author of a book titled Cheaters Prosper: How Infidelity Will Save the Modern Marriage.

Biderman has played basketball, volleyball, football, tennis, and hockey throughout the majority of his life. He also collects ancient coins and first-edition novels.

Biderman married Amanda Biderman in 2003, and the couple have two children. Amanda is originally from South Africa, and has a background in marketing. Prior to the hack, Biderman mentioned he is a happily married father of two and does not himself cheat. It has been alleged, through e-mails leaked during the hack, that Biderman carried on several extramarital affairs over the course of his marriage.
