= Museum of Broken Relationships =

- Muzej prekinutih veza

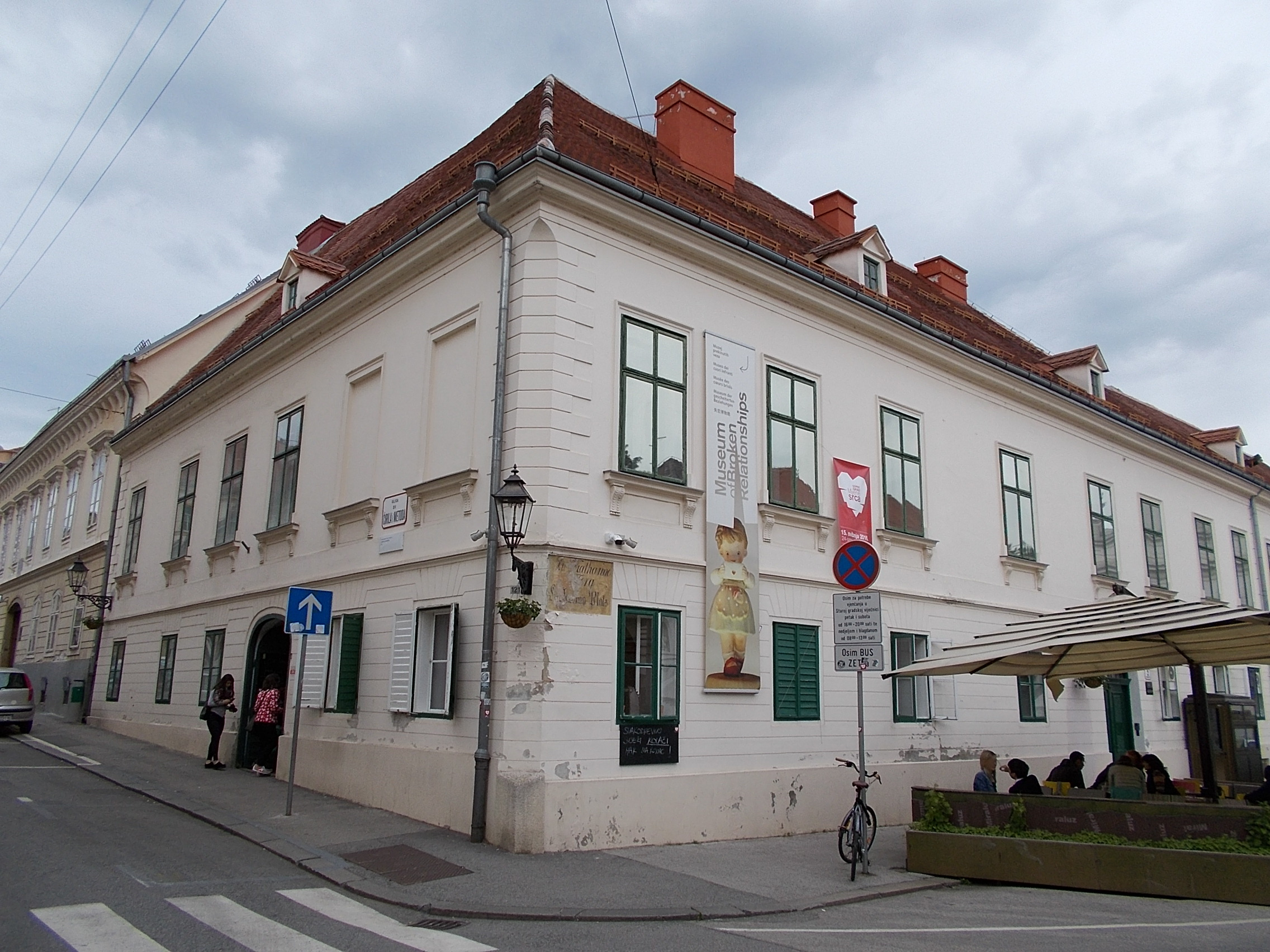
- Corner of the museum, in Zagreb's Upper Town.
- Established: 2010
- Location: 2 Sv. Ćirila i Metoda Street; Zagreb, Croatia
- Type: Specialized museum
- Visitors: 111,798 (2019)
- Directors: Olinka Vištica and Dražen Grubišić
- Website: brokenships.com

The Museum of Broken Relationships (Croatian: Muzej prekinutih veza) is a museum in Zagreb, Croatia, founded by artists Olinka Vištica and Dražen Grubišić. It grew from a traveling exhibition revolving around the concept of failed relationships and their ruins. The museum features a diverse collection of objects, each representing a personal story of a past relationship, contributing to a broader narrative of human emotional experiences.

In 2011, the museum was awarded the Kenneth Hudson Award for European Museum of the Year, for Europe's most innovative museum. This accolade acknowledged the museum's unique concept and its ability to engage audiences by presenting intimate, personal histories as part of a broader cultural dialogue.

In 2017, the museum saw more than 100,000 visitors, making it the 11th most visited museum in Croatia.

Since its inception, the museum has toured 68 cities across 35 countries, including Tokyo, San Francisco, Berlin, Paris, London, and Shanghai. The traveling exhibits have played a vital role in expanding the collection and adding layers of social, cultural, and historical context to the narratives of heartbreak and separation.

In November 2024, the Museum of Broken Relationships opened its second permanent location in Chiang Mai, Thailand.

== History ==
The museum was founded by two Zagreb-based artists, Olinka Vištica, a film producer, and Dražen Grubišić, a sculptor. After their four-year love relationship came to an end in 2003, the two joked about setting up a museum to house the left-over personal items. Three years later, Grubišić contacted Vištica with this idea, this time in earnest. They started asking their friends to donate objects left behind from their break-ups, and the collection was born. It was shown to the public for the first time in 2006, in Glyptotheque Zagreb, as a part of the 41st Zagreb Salon.

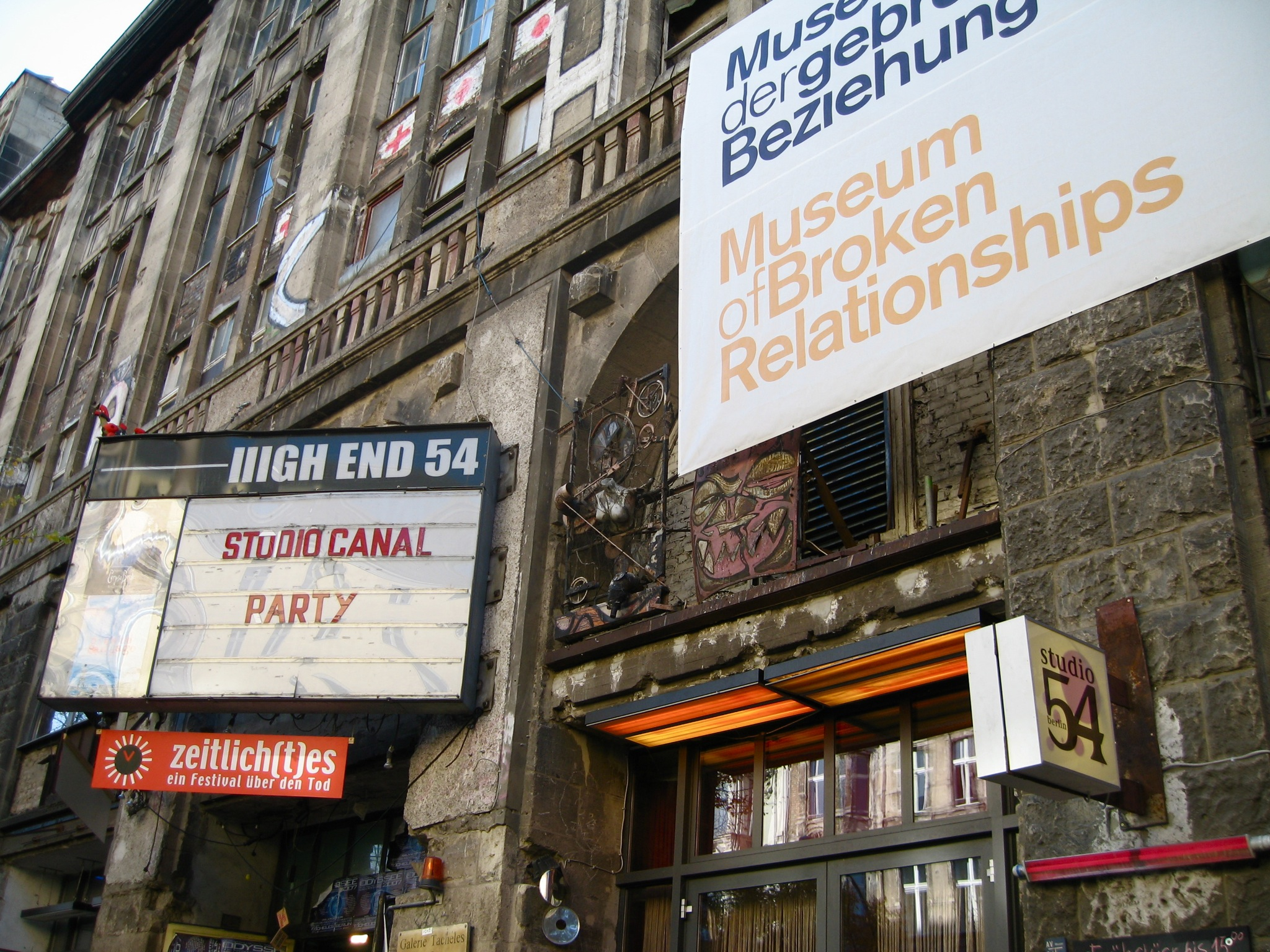
The Museum of Broken Relationships, hosted by the Kunsthaus Tacheles, was a hit with Berlin museumgoers in 2007.

In the years that followed, the collection went on a world tour, visiting Argentina, Bosnia and Herzegovina, Germany, Macedonia, the Philippines, Serbia, Singapore, Slovenia, South Africa, Turkey, the United Kingdom, and the United States. Between 2006 and 2010, the collection was seen by more than 200,000 visitors. Along the way, it gathered new items donated by members of the public; more than 30 objects were donated by Berliners alone during the exhibition in that city in 2007.

In the meantime, after unsuccessful attempts to interest the Croatian Ministry of Culture in finding a permanent location for the museum, Vištica and Grubišić decided to make a private investment and rent a 300-square-meter (3,200 sq ft) space in Zagreb's Upper Town, making it the city's first privately owned museum. The museum opened in October 2010 and proved popular with foreign tourists in particular, not only due to its original subject matter, but also the fact that it is open seven days a week, unlike other museums in the city.

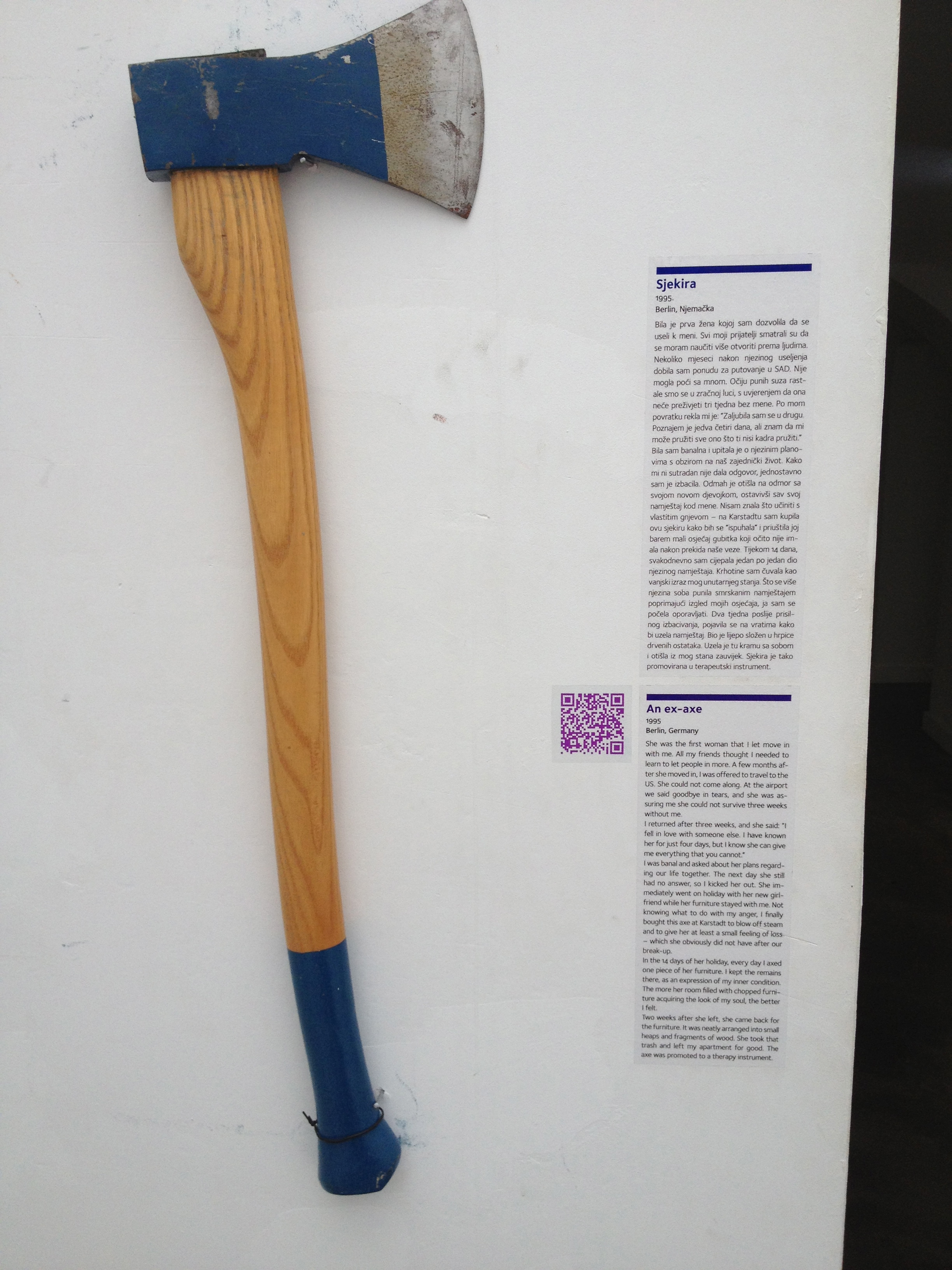
This exhibit, labeled "ex-axe", was donated by a woman from Berlin. She used it to chop her former lover's furniture in frustration after being left for another woman: two weeks after she left, she came back for the furniture. It was neatly arranged into small heaps and fragments of wood. She took that trash and left my apartment for good. The axe was promoted to a therapy instrument.

In May 2011, the Museum of Broken Relationships received the Kenneth Hudson Award, given out by the European Museum Forum (EMF). The award goes to "a museum, person, project or group of people who have demonstrated the most unusual, daring and, perhaps, controversial achievement that challenges common perceptions of the role of museums in society", rating the "importance of public quality and innovation as fundamental elements of a successful museum". The EMF's judging panel noted:

The Museum of Broken Relationships encourages discussion and reflection not only on the fragility of human relationships but also on the political, social, and cultural circumstances surrounding the stories being told. The museum respects the audience's capacity for understanding wider historical, social issues inherent to different cultures and identities and provides a catharsis for donors on a more personal level.

== Concept ==
The Museum's collection, built through community contributions, consists of approximately 3,500 objects donated by individuals from around the world and it is continually growing. Each item is a symbolic memento of a past relationship, accompanied by an anonymous story from the donor.

The project is divided into several segments:

- Material remains layout includes the objects that are presented with dates and locations of the relationship, and annotations by their anonymous donors. Due to physical space constraints, not all of the objects from the collection are displayed at the same time.
- Virtual web museum enables the registered visitors to become donors through uploading their images and documents. Donors can decide whether to open their personal collections for viewing by other users of the museum.

== See also ==
- Museum of Failure, inspired by the Museum of Broken Relationships
- List of museums in Croatia
