= My Friend Cayla =

Line of toys with speech recognition technology

- Other names: Cayla Doll
- Type: Doll
- Invented by: Bob Delprincipe
- Company: Genesis Toys
- Country: Germany
- Availability: 2014–2017
- Slogan: The World's Best Talking Doll

My Friend Cayla was a line of 18-inch (46 cm) dolls which used speech recognition technology in conjunction with a smartphone app to recognize a child's speech and perform conversations with users. The doll used the internet to search what the user said, and then responded with data that it found online. My Friend Cayla was created by Bob Delprincipe, inventor of Cindy Smart and Tekno the Robotic Puppy.

The doll generated much controversy due to its recording feature and internet connection, causing concerns that it was collecting information on children and that it could be hacked. This resulted in the doll being banned in Germany, since the German government considers it to be a surveillance device.

== Background ==
My Friend Cayla was distributed by Vivid in the United Kingdom. Genesis was the distributor for users from the United States of America, and the doll entered the US market in August 2015.

== Technology ==
Cayla functioned by sending microphone inputs to an app on an iOS or Android device via Bluetooth. The app then parsed the speech into text and used keywords from the speech that it heard to search the Internet for a response.

Cayla also had a "personality", with a database containing details of her family, pets, and interests, such as ballet. The doll could be used by children to ask for help with homework, and had a free Spanish language version.

The creator of the doll, Bob Delprincipe, says "She's not a search engine, she's a seven-year-old girl. There are some things she just doesn't know." He argued that though there had been 'intelligent' toys before, there had never been an Internet-connected doll.

== Awards ==
The doll was named 2014 Innovative Toy of the Year by the London Toy Industry Association, and was a top 10 toy for all key European retailers that holiday season. In 2015 My Friend Cayla won Most Wanted Dolls of 2015 from TTPM (Toys, Tots, Pets & More).

== Controversy ==
=== Hacking ===
Ken Munro of security firm Pen Test Partners claimed he hacked the doll, and demonstrated the hack in the BBC World News Tech Tent program. Tim Medin from Counter Hack also hacked the doll by simply using Bluetooth to use it as a remote speaker and microphone, which could be used to communicate with children. Additionally, the official website for the doll claimed that it was incapable of using inappropriate language, as its software had a pre-set list of blocked words. However, hackers were able to get it to say swears from the blocked list.

Peter Magalhaes, general manager of Genesis, described the doll as "the subject of a tech prank." The creator of the doll, Bob Delprincipe, said, "She's not a search engine, she's a seven-year-old girl. There are some things she just doesn't know." This statement was criticized as an attempt to anthropomorphize the doll.

=== Surveillance threat ===
Concerns were raised that Cayla could harvest personal data of children. The doll could allegedly learn family routines and remember when children were likely to be unattended. It could also ask children to give away personal information, such as their parents' names and where they go to school.

In February 2017 the German Federal Network Agency notified parents that they were obliged to "destroy" any Cayla in their possession as it constitutes a concealed espionage device violating the German Telecommunications Act. Keeping the doll can result in a large fine or two years in prison. The agency also considers the Bluetooth device as insecure, allowing connections to Cayla's speaker and microphone within a 10 m (33 ft) radius. One report claimed it had hacked the profiles of 508,000 children and 390,000 parents.

The doll has also been criticised by the Norwegian Consumer Council for allowing the use of the collected data from the child's speech for targeted advertisements and other commercial purposes and its sharing with third parties, as well as for hidden advertisements through the doll's positive statements about certain products and services. For example, Cayla would often praise Disney movies, such as the then-recent Frozen, and talk about visiting Epcot and Disneyland; the provider of the app she ran on had a commercial partnership with Disney.

In the United States, the Electronic Privacy Information Center filed a complaint about Cayla to the Federal Trade Commission, believing the doll could violate the Children's Online Privacy Protection Act. Senators Mark Warner and Edward J. Markey supported such investigations into the doll. The FTC considered an investigation, but when Senator Warner reached out to the FTC via letter, they could not confirm or deny whether Genesis Toys had been investigated. The controversy caused the toys to be removed from several American retailers, such as Target and Toys "R" Us, though Amazon continued to sell it for some time.

== Aftermath ==
The resulting controversy led to the doll's inclusion in the Museum of Failure in Sweden, where similar failed products and services which were either commercial failures or are controversial in their own right are on display. The Spy Museum Berlin also has a Cayla doll on display, the first toy in its collection of various espionage and surveillance devices. The doll was donated by a German mother who found the doll in her daughter's room after hearing about a government order to destroy the dolls following a ban on its sale and possession.

Genesis, the toy's American manufacturer, seemingly went out of business following the controversy. The company's website has not been updated in years and no longer sells the doll.

The controversy surrounding My Friend Cayla, as well as other internet of things toys such as Hello Barbie, led to increased discussion over European Union's laws concerning advertising to children. In the 2020s, with advent and popularity of toys powered by artificial intelligence, My Friend Cayla is sometimes brought up in discussions and criticisms of such "smart" toys.

== See also ==
- 2017 CloudPets data breach
- Internet of things
- M3gan
- Surveillance capitalism
