= Museum of Particularly Bad Art =

Annual Australian art event

The logo for Museum of Particularly Bad Art. (Picture of Elvis and Priscilla Presley)

The Museum of Particularly Bad Art Exhibition (MOPBA) is an annual event held on Chapel Street, Melbourne, Australia celebrating poor art forms, primarily in the forms of paintings and sketches. MOPBA relies on a core group of art pieces owned by Helen Round but the public are invited to enter pieces that are their own or that have been found that are considered poor. The event primarily is a charity event that funds three charities within the Stonnington area.

== History ==
The founder of MOPBA is Helen Round, who admits her career as an artist never took off for "lack of talent". In the early 1990s, Foreign Correspondent reported on the Museum of Bad Art in Dedham, United States. At this point of her life, Round was in the process of establishing a retail shop named "Fat Helen’s Bric a Brac shop", that was to specialise in the kitsch, inane and tasteless. It was also a hobby of Round's to peruse op shops, garage sales and markets. She was inspired by what she came across in these places and commenced her pursuit of collecting and preserving the mediocre. Round started collecting in 1993.

Since then, Helen Round has collected 200 examples of original art of poor taste. Of notable fame is the original portrait of actor Scott Baio that Round located in an op shop in the suburb of Windsor in 1996. By Helen Round's own admission, "It's all crap [...] If a painting was any good, it would have no place on our walls" and "I never pay more than $2 for a painting".

The first official exhibition took place in 1999.

== Itchiball Prize ==
The Itchiball Prize, launched by the museum in 1999, awards the art piece that is considered by the public to be the poorest. The name is a play on words and parody of the Archibald Prize, Australia's most important portraiture painting award. 50 entries are usually submitted every year, and the contestants do not have to be the authors of their entries. The winners were:

- 2005: Windsor Junkie circa 1896
- 2006: Last Gasp Grannie (made with real human hair) and Never Say Di
- 2007: Conan, the barbed Aryan (submitted by a fireman who found it in the street)
- 2009: BEN Butcher, Why do we need a porpoise in life?

== Criteria ==
Windsor Junkie circa 1896 – Itchiball Prize Winner 2005.

The entries from the public are judged by meeting one point on the selection criteria. Selection points for entry of an art piece into MOPBA are:

- Completely devoid of technical skill (Colour, tone, perspective and shading);
- Unusual, poor or tasteless subject matters;
- Passion of the artist but is driven by an uneducated hand;
- An instinctual feeling that the art piece is poor.

== See also ==
- Kitsch
- Museum of Bad Art
