= Museum of Bad Art =

Art museum in Boston, Massachusetts

- MOBA's location Museum of Bad Art (the United States)
- Established: 1993
- Location: 1250 Massachusetts Ave (Dorchester Brewing Company), Boston, Massachusetts
- Coordinates: 42°19′19″N 71°03′45″W
- Type: Art museum
- Director: Louise Reilly Sacco
- Curator: Michael Frank
- Public transit access: MBTA subway: Red Line at JFK/UMass station
- Website: www.museumofbadart.org

The Museum of Bad Art (MOBA) is a privately owned museum whose stated aim is "to celebrate the labor of artists whose work would be displayed and appreciated in no other forum". It was originally in Dedham, Massachusetts, and is currently in Boston, Massachusetts. Its permanent collection includes over 700 pieces of "art too bad to be ignored", 25 to 35 of which are on public display at any one time.

MOBA was founded in 1993, after antique dealer Scott Wilson showed a painting he had recovered from the trash to some friends, who suggested starting a collection. Within a year, receptions held in Wilson's friends' home were so well-attended that the collection needed its own viewing space. The museum then moved to the basement of a theater in Dedham. Explaining the reasoning behind the museum's establishment, co-founder Jerry Reilly said in 1995: "While every city in the world has at least one museum dedicated to the best of art, MOBA is the only museum dedicated to collecting and exhibiting the worst." To be included in MOBA's collection, works must be original and have serious intent, but they must also have significant flaws without being boring; curators are not interested in displaying deliberate kitsch.

MOBA has been mentioned in dozens of off-the-beaten-path guides to Boston, featured in international newspapers and magazines, and has inspired several other collections throughout the world. Deborah Solomon of The New York Times Magazine noted that the attention the Museum of Bad Art receives is part of a wider trend of museums displaying "the best bad art". The museum has been criticized for being anti-art, but the founders deny this, responding that its collection is a tribute to the sincerity of the artists who persevered with their art despite something going horribly wrong in the process. According to co-founder Marie Jackson, "We are here to celebrate an artist's right to fail, gloriously." In a chat with the Sunn on how to identify bad art, MOBA's curator Michael Frank says, "Here at the Museum Of Bad Art (MOBA) we collect art that we believe was created in a serious attempt to make art but in which, either in the execution or original concept, something has gone terribly wrong. Rather than simply amateurish, the resulting image must be, for one reason or another, compelling to be considered museum-worthy. Some of the most interesting pieces in our collection are ones that show that the artist had some technical skill, but made some questionable decisions such as over-the-top imagery."

== History ==
The Museum of Bad Art was founded by antique dealer Scott Wilson, who discovered what has become the museum's signature piece—Lucy in the Field with Flowers—protruding from between two trash cans on a Roslindale-area curb in Boston, among some garbage waiting to be collected. Wilson was initially interested only in the frame, but when he showed the picture to his friend Jerry Reilly, the latter wanted both the frame and the painting. He exhibited Lucy in his home, and encouraged friends to look for other bad art and notify Wilson of what they found. When Wilson acquired another "equally lovely" piece and shared it with Reilly, they decided to start a collection. Reilly and his wife, Marie Jackson, held a party in their basement to exhibit the collection to date, and hosted a reception they facetiously titled "The Opening of the Museum of Bad Art".

Regular showings of the pieces collected by Wilson, Reilly, and Jackson (and those donated by others), became too much for Reilly and Jackson's small home in West Roxbury, Massachusetts, as hundreds of people attended the receptions. The founders' initial attempt at dealing with their constrained exhibition space was to create the Virtual Museum Of Bad Art, a CD-ROM with a cast of 95 people that presented the MOBA art collection in a fictional imaginary museum. This fictional MOBA allowed the visitors not only to view the paintings but to go behind the scenes in the fictional museum.

The MOBA was officially founded in 1993, and its first exhibition was presented in March 1994.

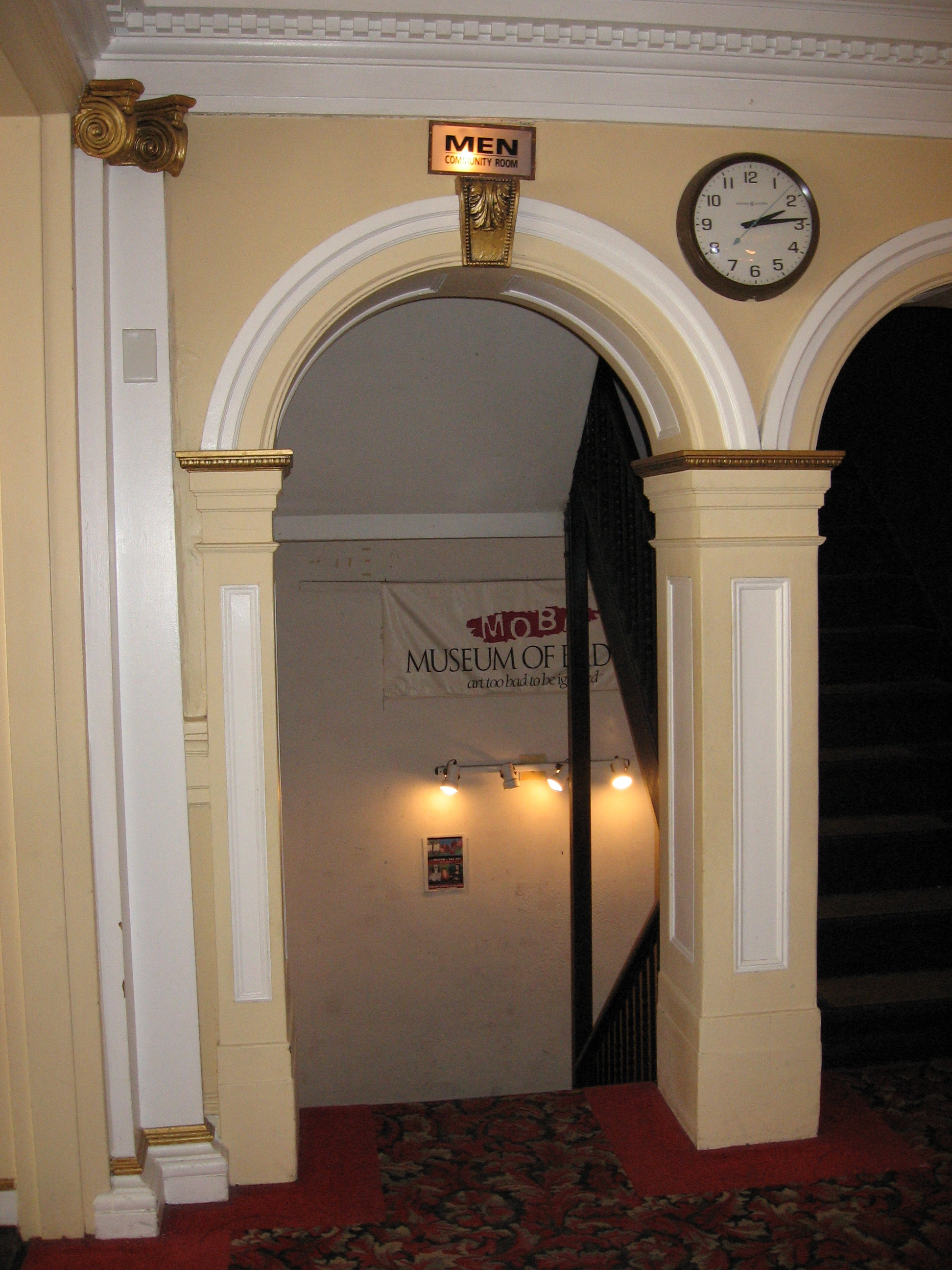
2:14 by Kafka Liz (2009). The original stairwell entrance to the Museum of Bad Art and the men's restroom

Word of the museum's collection continued to spread until, according to "Permanent Interim Acting Director" Louise Reilly Sacco, "it got completely out of hand" when a group of senior citizens on a tour bus stopped to see it. In 1995, the display space was moved to the basement of the Dedham Community Theatre, a building with an aesthetic described in 2004 as "ramshackle". The museum in Dedham had no fixed operating hours, instead being open while the theater upstairs was open. As The Boston Globe notes, the art collection was appropriately placed "just outside the men's room", where sounds and smells carry to the collection and the constant flushing of the toilet "supposedly helps maintain a uniform humidity", according to the South China Morning Post.

In MOBA's early days, the museum hosted traveling shows; on one occasion the works were hung from trees in the woods on Cape Cod for the "Art Goes Out the Window—The Gallery in the Woods". Bad music was played during the public viewings to complete the ambiance. In an exhibition titled "Awash in Bad Art", 18 pieces of art were covered in shrink wrap for "the world's first drive-thru museum and car wash". Marie Jackson, formerly the Director of Aesthetic Interpretation noted, "We didn't put any watercolors in there." A 2001 exhibition, "Buck Naked—Nothing But Nudes" featured all of the MOBA nudes hung in a local spa.

MOBA features its works in rotating collections. In 2003, "Freaks of Nature" focused on landscape artwork "gone awry". A 2006 exhibit titled "Hackneyed Portraits" was designed to "pick up some of the slack" when the David Hockney show at Boston's Museum of Fine Arts closed. MOBA unveiled its show "Nature Abhors a Vacuum and All Other Housework" in 2006; this format continues on the museum's website.

A second gallery opened in 2008 at the Somerville Theatre in Davis Square, Somerville, Massachusetts, where the collection was placed near both the women's and men's restrooms. Although the original gallery was free and open to the public, the second is free with admission to the theater or with a pass requested from the museum. Exhibitions titled "Bright Colors / Dark Emotions" and "Know What You Like / Paint How You Feel" have been held in the academic gallery at Montserrat College of Art in Beverly, Massachusetts. One of MOBA's goals is "to take bad art on the road", according to Sacco. Pieces from MOBA's collection have been on display in museums in New York City, Ottawa, Taipei, and Virginia.

In February 2009, MOBA announced a fundraiser to assist the Rose Art Museum at Brandeis University, which was seriously considering whether to sell masterpieces because of the 2008 financial crisis, made worse for the university by some of its donors losing money in the Madoff investment scandal. Current MOBA curator Michael Frank placed Studies in Digestion—a four-panel piece showing four renditions of the human digestive tract in various media by artist Deborah Grumet—on eBay for a buy-it-now price of $10,000; the first bid was $24.99. It eventually sold for $152.53 and the meager proceeds went to the Rose Art Museum, while both museums gained publicity.

In 2010, the museum opened a third location in the offices of the Brookline Interactive Group.

In December 2012, the branch at the Dedham Community Theater closed to convert the space into a screening room. Another branch later opened at the New England Wildlife Center in South Weymouth. The Somerville location was closed in 2019 when theater owners sought to renovate the basement space it occupied. All locations closed after the breakout of the COVID-19 pandemic in 2020. The museum reopened at the Dorchester Brewing Company's tap room in Boston in September 2022. In 2026, production began on an independent documentary chronicling the museum's history and its impact on the global art community.

=== Thefts ===
The loss of two MOBA works to theft has drawn media attention and enhanced the museum's stature. In 1996, the painting Eileen, by R. Angelo Le, vanished from MOBA. Eileen was originally acquired from the trash by Wilson and had a rip in the canvas from being slashed with a knife, "adding an additional element of drama to an already powerful work", according to MOBA.

The museum offered a reward of $6.50 for the return of Eileen, and although MOBA donors later increased that reward to $36.73, the work remained unrecovered for many years. The Boston Police listed the crime as "larceny, other", and Sacco was reported saying she was unable to establish a link between the disappearance of Eileen and a notorious heist at Boston's famed Isabella Stewart Gardner Museum that occurred in 1990. In 2006, 10 years after Eileen was stolen, MOBA was contacted by the purported thief demanding a $5,000 ransom for the painting; no ransom was paid, but it was returned anyway.

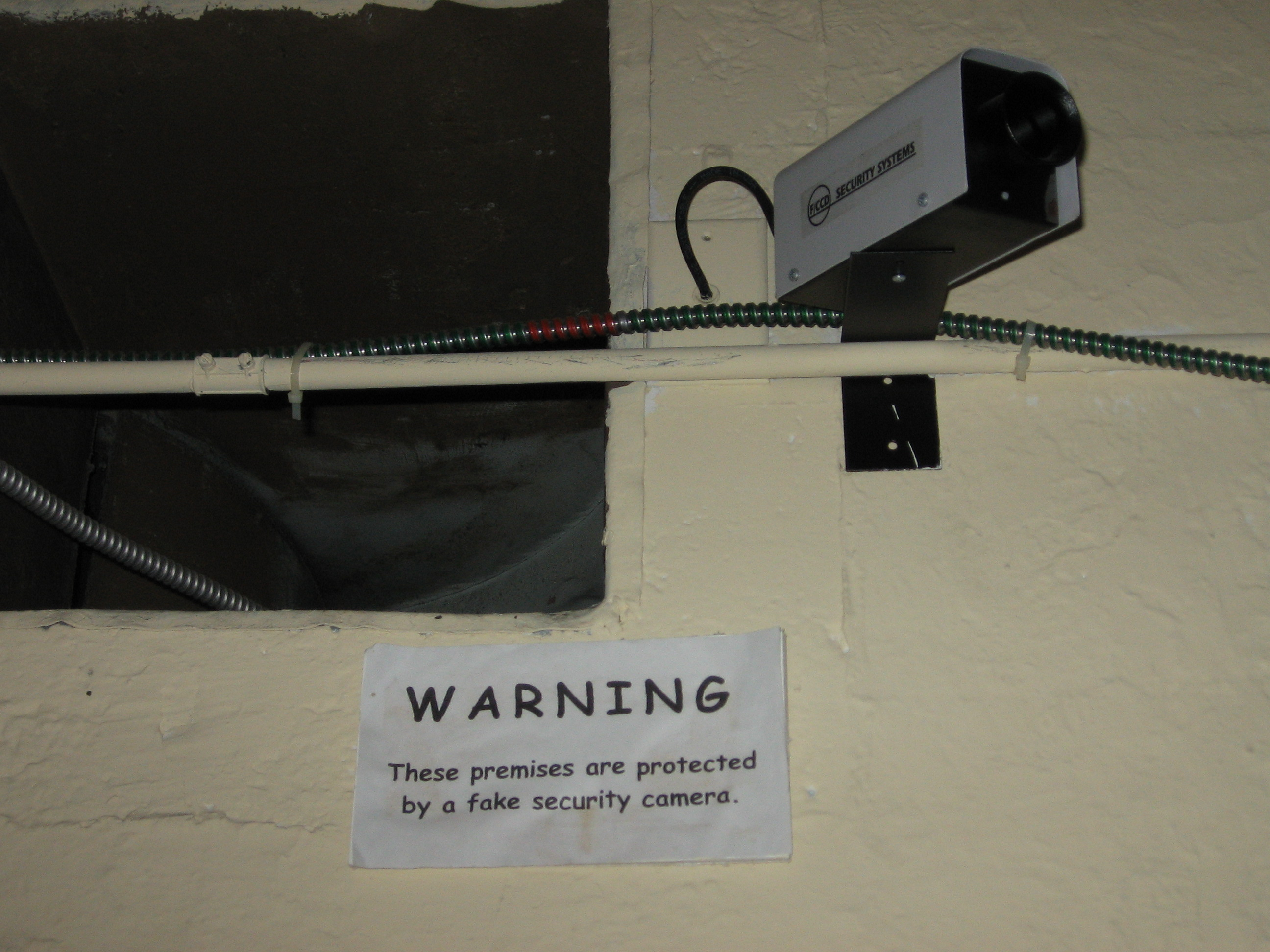
Fake security camera at the former Dedham branch of MOBA, photographed in 2009

Prompted by the theft of Eileen, MOBA staff installed a fake video camera over a sign at their Dedham branch reading (in Comic Sans): "Warning. This gallery is protected by a fake security camera". In 2004, Rebecca Harris' Self Portrait as a Drainpipe was removed from the wall and replaced with a ransom note demanding $10, although the thief neglected to include any contact information. Soon after its disappearance the painting was returned, with a $10 donation. Curator Michael Frank speculates that the thief had difficulty fencing the portrait because "reputable institutions refuse to negotiate with criminals."

== Collection standards ==
Although the museum's motto is "Art too bad to be ignored", MOBA holds rigorous standards as to what they will accept. According to Marie Jackson, "Nine out of ten pieces don't get in because they're not bad enough. What an artist considers to be bad doesn't always meet our low standards." As stated in the introduction to The Museum of Bad Art: Masterworks, the primary attribute of an objet d'art to be acquired by MOBA is that it must have been seriously attempted by someone making an artistic statement. A lack of artistic skill is not essential for a work to be included; a prospective painting or sculpture for the collection ideally should "[result] in a compelling image", or as honorary curator Ollie Hallowell stated, the art must have an "Oh my God" quality.

An important criterion for inclusion is that a painting or sculpture must not be boring. Michael Frank says they are not interested in commercial works like Dogs Playing Poker: "We collect things made in earnest, where people attempted to make art and something went wrong, either in the execution or in the original premise." Montserrat College of Art used MOBA's exhibition as a demonstration to its students that "sincerity is still important, and pureness of intent is valid".

MOBA accepts unsolicited works if they meet its standards. Frequently, curators consider works by artists who display an intensity or emotion in the art that they are unable to reconcile with their level of skill. The museum dedicated a show to "relentless creativity" in an exhibition titled "I Just Can't Stop" that was covered by local news and CNN. Other artists are clearly technically proficient, but attempted an experiment that did not end well. Michael Frank has compared some of the works at MOBA with outsider art; some MOBA artists' works are also included in other galleries' outsider collections. Dean Nimmer, a professor at the Massachusetts College of Art (also holding the title of MOBA's Executive Director of Good Taste), noted the parallels between the Museum of Bad Art's standards and those of other institutions: "They take the model of a museum of fine arts and apply the same kind of criteria to acceptance for bad work ... [Their rules] are very similar to a gallery or museum that says 'Well, our area is really installation art or realist paintings or neo-post-modern abstractions.'"

MOBA does not collect art created by children, or art traditionally perceived as lesser in quality, such as black velvet paintings, paint-by-numbers, kitsch, or factory-produced art—including works specifically created for tourists. Curators are also not interested in crafts such as latch hook rug kits. MOBA curators jokingly suggest that more appropriate venues for such works would be the "Museum of Questionable Taste, The International Schlock Collection, or the National Treasury of Dubious Home Decoration".

The Museum of Bad Art has been accused of being anti-art, or taking works that were sincerely rendered and mocking them. However, Scott Wilson insists that a work of art accepted into MOBA is a celebration of the artist's enthusiasm. Marie Jackson reiterated this thought, saying "I think it's a great encouragement to people... who want to create [and] are held back by fear, and when they see these pieces, they realize there's nothing to be afraid of—just go for it." Louise Reilly Sacco agreed, stating, "If we're making fun of something, it's the art community, not the artists. But this is a real museum. It's 10 years. It's 6,000 people on a mailing list. It's recognition all over the world." Curators insist that artists whose works are selected by MOBA enjoy the attention and that it is a win-win; the museum gains another work of art, and the artist receives exposure in a museum. A 1997 article in The Chicago Tribune stated that none of the 10 to 15 artists who had stepped forward to acknowledge their work in MOBA had been upset.

Many of the works in MOBA are donated, often by the artists themselves. Others come from yard sales or thrift stores; the Trash Collectors Union in Cambridge, Massachusetts, has donated works rescued from imminent demise. Occasionally, a painting may be purchased; at one time, MOBA's policy was not to spend more than $6.50 on any piece. More recently, twice and even three times that amount has been paid for an exceptional work. Those pieces not retained by the museum are included in a "Rejection Collection" that may be sold at auction. In the past, some proceeds went to the Salvation Army for providing so many of MOBA's pieces; the museum itself usually benefits from most auctions.

== Collection highlights ==
Each painting or sculpture MOBA exhibits is accompanied by a brief description of the medium, size, name of the artist, as well as how the piece was acquired, and an analysis of the work's possible intention or symbolism. Museums Journal noted that the discussion accompanying each work would probably have most visitors reduced "to hysterics". The captions—described as "distinctly tongue-in-cheek commentaries" by David Mutch of the Christian Science Monitor—were primarily written by Marie Jackson, until the "dissolution of the MOBA interpretative staff"; the task was then taken over by Michael Frank and Louise Reilly Sacco.

=== Lucy in the Field with Flowers ===
Many of MOBA's works generate extensive discourse from visitors. Lucy in the Field with Flowers (oil on canvas by Unknown; acquired from trash in Boston) remains a favorite with the news media and patrons. As the first work acquired by the museum, Lucy is "a painting so powerful it commands its own preservation for posterity", setting a standard by which all future acquisitions would be compared.

Kate Swoger of The Montreal Gazette called Lucy a "gorgeous mistake", describing her thus: "an elderly woman dancing in a lush spring field, sagging breasts flopping willy-nilly, as she inexplicably seems to hold a red chair to her behind with one hand and a clutch of daisies in the other". Author Cash Peters, using less florid language, summarized it as "the old woman with an armchair glued to her ass".

MOBA's statement about Lucy reads: "The motion, the chair, the sway of her breast, the subtle hues of the sky, the expression on her face—every detail combines to create this transcendent and compelling portrait, every detail cries out 'masterpiece'." The Times recounted comments left by a museum visitor regarding the "endless layers of mysteries" the image offers: "What is Norman Mailer's head doing on an innocent grandma's body, and are those crows or F-16s skimming the hills?"

The granddaughter of the painting's subject, a Boston-area nurse named Susan Lawlor, became a fan of MOBA after seeing the portrait in a newspaper. She recognized it as her grandmother, Anna Lally Keane (c. 1890–1968); upon seeing the picture, Lawlor snorted Coca-Cola from her nose in astonishment. The painting was commissioned by her mother, and it hung in her aunt's house for many years, despite the trepidation family members felt at seeing the final composition. Says Lawlor: "The face is hauntingly hers, but everything else is so horribly wrong. It looks like she only has one breast. I'm not sure what happened to her arms and legs, and I don't know where all the flowers and yellow sky came from."

=== Sunday on the Pot with George ===
Sunday on the Pot with George (acrylic on canvas by John Gedraitis; donated by Jim Schulman) has been deemed "iconic" by Bella English of The Boston Globe, who assures the work is "100 percent guaranteed to make you burst out laughing". Wilson has pointed to George as an example of a technically well-executed piece of art using a subject not usually seen rendered in paint.

Many admirers of the first work donated to MOBA are hypnotized by the image of a portly man wearing "Y-front" underwear while sitting on a chamber pot, in pointillist impressionism similar to the style of Georges Seurat. One critic speculates the pointillist style in George may have been acquired "from watching too much TV". The title refers to the Stephen Sondheim musical Sunday in the Park with George, which contains a dramatic recreation of Seurat's painting A Sunday Afternoon on the Island of La Grande Jatte. Author Amy Levin suggests that George is a pastiche of Seurat's painting. The subject of this painting has been "tentatively identified" by the Annals of Improbable Research—the creators of the Ig Nobel award—as John Ashcroft, former United States Attorney General.

A visitor in response to seeing George displayed in the Dedham Community Theatre basement, wrote: "Someone had slipped into the bathroom as I took in this painting and began peeing loudly into a toilet. The reverberating sound of urine splashing while viewing George brought the painting to life, and when the denouement of the flush sounded, I wept." MOBA's accompanying caption introduces questions and observations: "Can the swirling steam melt away the huge weight of George's corporate responsibilities? This pointillist piece is curious for meticulous attention to fine detail, such as the stitching around the edge of the towel, in contrast to the almost careless disregard for the subject's feet."

=== Bone-Juggling Dog in Hula Skirt ===
In contrast to the pointillist impressionism of George, the museum also features a "fine example of labor-intensive pointlessism", according to MOBA staff. Mari Newman's Bone-Juggling Dog in Hula Skirt (tempera and acrylic paint on canvas; donated by the artist), inspired this description by MOBA: "We can only wonder what possesses an artist to portray a dog juggling bones while wearing a hula skirt." MOBA enjoys the mystery as much as any other aspect of art, however.

Newman, a professional artist from Minneapolis, responded to the curators' cogitation by describing how the image came into being. She bought used canvases while a poor art student, and was unsure how to use a canvas with these dimensions. Inspired by a cartoon of a dachshund, she chose that as a subject, but was unhappy with the effect until she added a hula skirt she had seen in a magazine, and colored dog bones she spied in a pet store. Newman wrote to them, saying "I almost threw it out until I heard of MOBA. After many years of slashing rejected work, now I wish I had saved them all for you."

=== Motifs and interpretations ===
Travel writer Cash Peters identifies six characteristics common to many of the museum's artworks. The first is that MOBA artists are unable to render hands or feet, and mask them by extending figures' arms off the canvas, hiding them with long sleeves, or placing shoes on feet in inappropriate scenarios. Second, Peters compared artists Rembrandt and J. M. W. Turner, masters of landscapes, who "could probably paint with their eyes shut" to MOBA artists who apparently did paint with their eyes shut, as skies are often painted in any color but blue, flora are created without reference to any existing plant organisms, and fauna appear so small in the background it is impossible to discern what kind of animals they are. Third, MOBA artists apply perspective inconsistently, either from one painting to the next, or within a single work. Peters's fourth observation concerns the difficulty MOBA artists seem to have in successfully rendering noses: he writes that a nose will be attempted so many times that the work takes on a third dimension as paint is reapplied over and over. Fifth, bad artists favor "mixed media": if in doubt, they glue feathers, glitter, or hair to their work. Lastly, Peters suggests that artists know their work is bad, but apparently feel the piece may be saved by including a monkey or a poodle in the composition.

Since late 2008, MOBA has been experimenting with allowing the public to title and caption some works. According to the curatorial staff, since some of the works are so puzzling, mere artistic interpretation is not sufficient: they must be "interpretated". The "Guest Interpretator's Collection" is an invitation for MOBA's visitors to include their thoughts on compelling artworks; a contest decides the best analysis and these interpretations are added as each contest ends. A professor at Boston University offered his thoughts: "The location of the museum as much as its collection suggests a commitment to the abject and a belief in the power and force of culture's marginalized effects. I was also reminded that I need to pick up some toilet bowl cleaner on my way home!"

== Influence ==
The Museum of Bad Art has been mentioned in hundreds of international publications, as well as in Boston-area travel guides highlighting offbeat attractions. It has inspired similar collections or events in Australia, Ohio, and Seattle.

Commedia Beauregard, a theatre company whose mission focuses on translation, was inspired by MOBA's mission to create their Master Works series of short play festivals. The company commissioned six playwrights to write short plays based on MOBA artworks. Master Works: The MOBA Plays was originally performed in January and February 2009 in Minneapolis, Minnesota. The plays were based on the MOBA pieces Mana Lisa, Invasion of the Office Zombies, My Left Foot, Bone-Juggling Dog in Hula Skirt, Gina's Demons, and Lulli, Fowl and Gravestone. After moving to Chicago, the company again produced The MOBA Plays in March and April 2011, using three of the original plays and translating three new paintings.

=== Responses to bad art ===
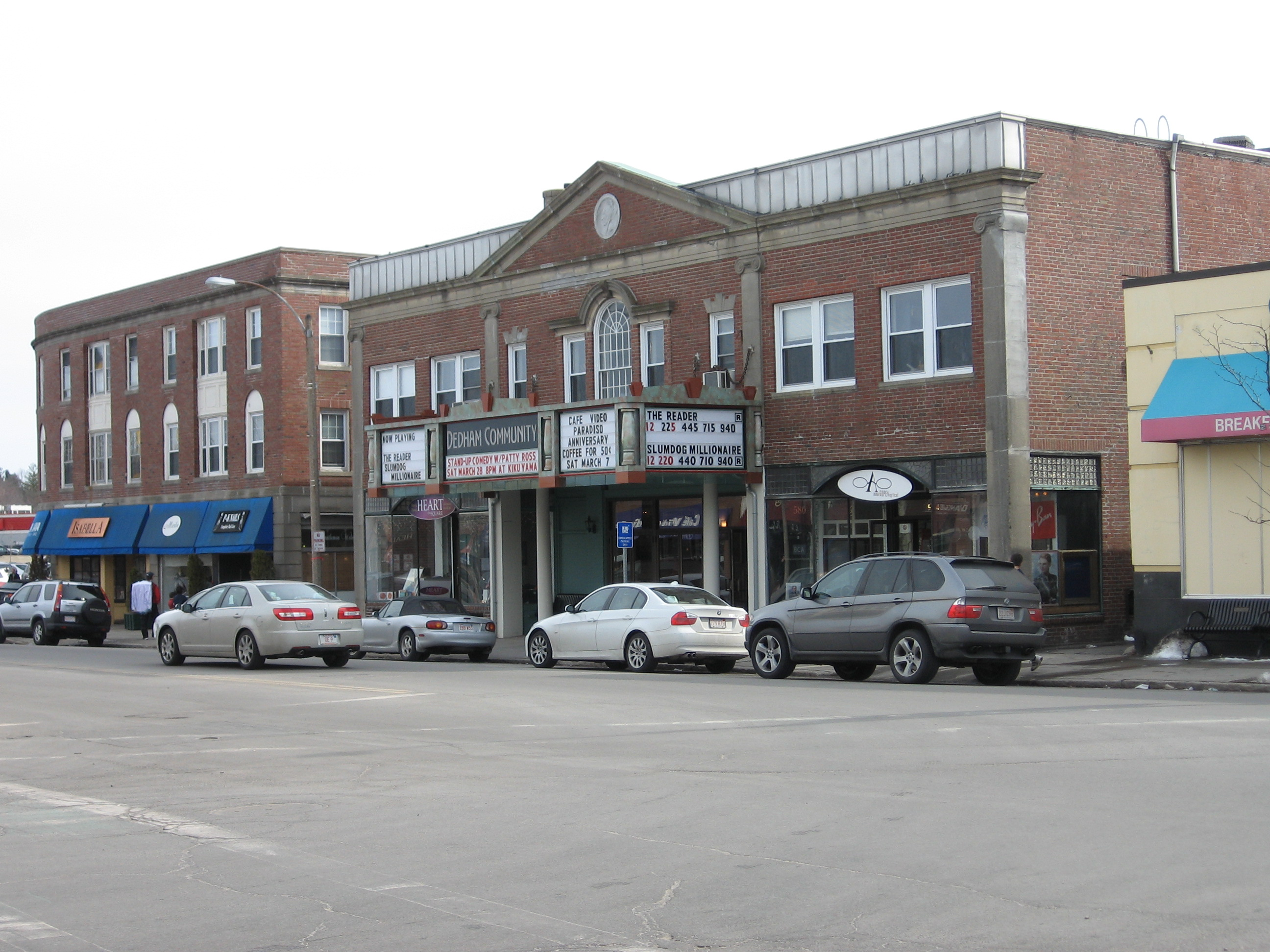
The Dedham Community Theater housed the first MOBA gallery in its basement.

Museum visitors can sign a guest book, and leave comments. One Canadian visitor wrote: "This collection is disturbing, yet I can't seem to look away...Just like a hideous car accident." Another visitor observes: "Her nipples follow you around the room. Creepy!"

Response to MOBA's opening and continued success is, for some, evocative of the way art is treated in society. MOBA works have been described as "unintentionally hilarious", similar to the films of Ed Wood. Visitors—and even MOBA staff—often laugh out loud at displays. In Gullible's Travels, Cash Peters contrasted this behavior with what is expected of patrons at galleries such as Southern California's Getty Museum; though viewers might find the art at the Getty equally hilarious, were they to show it they would almost certainly be thrown out.

In 2006, Louise Reilly Sacco participated in a panel discussion with authorities on art and architecture about standards of beauty and ugliness in art, published in Architecture Boston. She remarked that teachers bring high school art students to MOBA, then to the Museum of Fine Arts, Boston (MFA). Sacco observes, "Somehow MOBA frees kids to laugh and point, to have their own opinions and argue about things. Then they take the experience to the MFA, where they might otherwise feel intimidated... Maybe the ugly ... frees us." Sacco believes that extreme ugliness is more striking than extreme beauty, and it forces people to think more deeply about what is wrong or misplaced. She connects this rigid judgment of what does not conform to beauty with intolerance for physical imperfections in people, noting that such rigidity sometimes causes parents to "fix" the perceived flaws in their children's faces to keep them from suffering later.

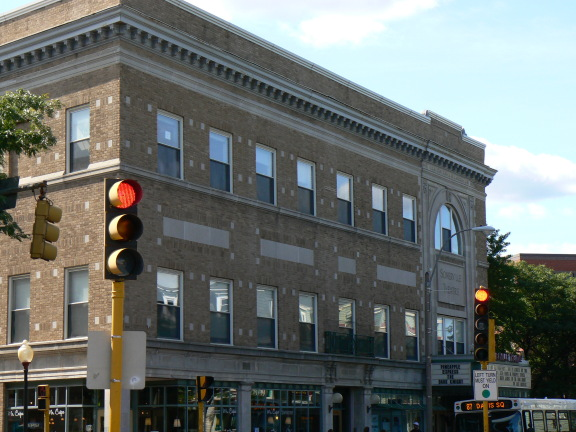
The Somerville Theatre once housed a MOBA gallery in its basement.

Jason Kaufman, a Harvard professor who teaches the sociology of culture, wrote that MOBA is part of a social trend he calls "annoyism", where mass media venues promote performances and artists who mix the deliberately bad with the clever. The Museum of Bad Art happens to embody this trend, and further illustrates its central aim to mock the judgment system by which people identify what is bad from what is not. For Kaufman, "The beauty of MOBA—though beauty is surely the wrong word—is the way it undermines aesthetic criteria from numerous angles." Amy Levin, describing how American history and culture have been shaped by small local museums, suggests that MOBA is a parody of art itself, and that MOBA's commentary, newsletter, website, and publications mock museums as authorities on what is good art. The director of the Ellipse Arts Center, a gallery in Arlington, Virginia, that hosted a traveling exhibition of MOBA works, was astonished to see people's exuberant laughter because no one visiting the Ellipse had ever responded to art this way. She observed, "If I didn't have a sign on the door, people might not think it's so bad. Who's to say what's bad and what's good?"

Deborah Solomon, in The New York Times Magazine, asserted that MOBA's success reflects a trend in modern art among artists and audiences. The arrival of abstraction and modern art in the early 20th century made art appreciation more esoteric and less accessible for the general community, showing that "the American public ... think[s] of museums as intimidating places ruled by a cadre of experts whose taste and rituals [seem] as mysterious as those of Byzantine priests." Bad art is in vogue, as a movement that rejects the anti-sentimentalism that marked earlier disdain for artists such as Norman Rockwell or Gustave Moreau, according to Solomon. Garen Daly, a MOBA fan on several Boston-area art councils, stated in 1995, "I go to a lot of openings, and sometimes they're pretty damn stuffy." Not only does the Museum of Bad Art offer different fare for the eyes, but instead of the wine and cheese that is provided for most museum and art gallery visitors, a MOBA show provides its patrons with Kool-Aid, Fluffernutters and cheese puffs.

=== Use in academic research ===
The works in the Museum of Bad Art have been used in academic studies as a standard of reference for low quality art. In one such study, published in Perspectives on Psychological Science, researchers tested the consistency of responses between people asked to make "gut" judgments versus those who gave conscious well-reasoned responses regarding the quality of various pieces of art. The researchers showed respondents images from MOBA and New York's Museum of Modern Art (MoMA) and asked them to rate each painting on a scale with two ends representing "Very Attractive" and "Very Unattractive". The study found that those who reasoned in conscious thought were neither more accurate nor as consistent in their ratings. Study participants identified and rated MoMA art higher quality, but those who used conscious reasoning did not find MoMA art more attractive than those who rated with "gut" judgments. Furthermore, the deliberators did not find MOBA art as unattractive as those with quicker response times. The study concluded that people who make quick judgments do so more consistently, with no significant change to accuracy.

In another study that appeared in the British Journal of Psychology, researchers tested how respondents considered balance in artwork composition of differing qualities. Fifteen pairs of works from ArtCyclopedia by artists such as Paul Gauguin, Georgia O'Keeffe, and Georges-Pierre Seurat, and fifteen from MOBA by artists including Doug Caderette, Unknown, and D. Alix were shown to participants. In each, an item in the painting was shifted vertically or horizontally, and respondents were asked to identify the original. The researchers hypothesized that respondents would identify balance and composition more easily in the traditional masterworks, and that study participants would find a greater change of quality when items were shifted in traditional masterworks than they would in MOBA pieces. However, the study concluded that balance alone did not define art of higher quality for the participants, and that respondents were more likely to see that original art was more balanced than the altered version, not necessarily that the traditional art was significantly better composed and balanced than MOBA works.

== See also ==
- Museum of Particularly Bad Art
