= Ashley Madison =

Canadian online dating service

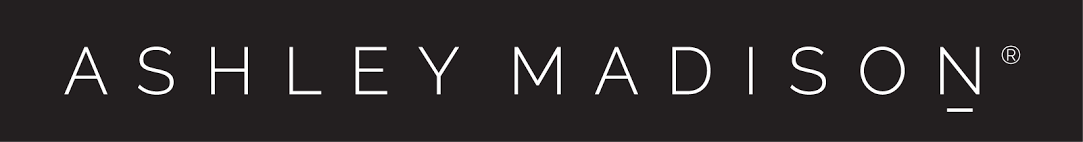
- Website type: Online dating service Social network service
- Available in: Chinese (simplified and traditional), Czech, Danish, Dutch, English, Finnish, French, German, Greek, Hungarian, Italian, Japanese, Korean, Norwegian, Polish, Portuguese (Brazilian and European), Romanian, Russian, Slovak, Spanish (European, American), Swedish, Tagalog, Turkish, Ukrainian
- Founder: Darren Morgenstern
- Key people: Paul Keable (Chief Strategy Officer); Brian Offenheim (Vice President of Creative and Design); Haze Deng (Chief Revenue Officer); George Al-Koura (Chief Information Security Officer); Srdjan Milutinovic (Chief Information Officer)
- Parent: Ruby Corp.
- Website: www.ashleymadison.com
- Commercial: Yes
- Registration: Yes
- Users: 60 million (as of February 2019)
- Launched: January 21, 2002; 24 years ago
- Current status: Active

Ashley Madison, or The Ashley Madison Agency, is a Canadian online dating and social networking service. It was launched in 2001 and marketed to people who are married or in relationships and looking for affairs. The website's slogan was "Life is short. Have an affair". In 2026, the company rebranded, turning away from married dating to focus on discreet dating. Its slogan is now "Where Desire Meets Discretion".

Ashley Madison has been criticised for being a "business built on the back of broken hearts" and the use of guerrilla marketing for advertising. The company gained notoriety in 2015, when it was subject to a data breach, and the personal information of millions of users was released to the public. The breach also revealed that the company exaggerated the size of its userbase by "creating fake accounts, or not stopping others from creating fake accounts".

== History ==
Ashley Madison was founded in 2001 by Darren J. Morgenstern. The name comes from two popular female names in North America, "Ashley" and "Madison".

The company announced plans to launch in Singapore in 2014. However, Singapore's Media Development Authority (MDA) stated that it would not allow Ashley Madison to operate there as "it promotes adultery and disregards family values".

In 2015, the company was reported to have 37 million users. On July 15, 2015, hackers stole all of its customer data—including emails, names, home addresses, sexual fantasies, and credit card information—and threatened to post the data online if Ashley Madison and fellow Avid Life Media site Established Men were not permanently closed. By July 22, the first set of customer names was released by hackers, with all of the user data released on August 18, 2015. More data (including some of the CEO's emails) was released on August 20, 2015. The release included data from customers who had previously paid a $19 fee to Ashley Madison to supposedly have their data deleted. The fee was also applied to people who had accounts set up against their will, as a workplace prank, or because of a mistyped email address.

On August 28, 2015, Noel Biderman agreed to step down as chief executive officer of Avid Life Media Inc. A statement released by the firm said his departure was "in the best interest of the company".

In July 2016, parent company Avid Life Media re-branded itself to Ruby Corp. and appointed Rob Segal as its new CEO. In the same month, the company changed its signature tagline from "Life is Short. Have an Affair." to "Find your moment", and updated its brand imagery to a red gem-shaped symbol.

By 2017, CEO Rob Segal and president James Millership had resigned from their respective roles.

In May 2017, Ashley Madison reintroduced the tagline "Life is short. Have an affair", symbolic of the company's renewed focus on married dating. In February 2019, the company announced it had 60 million members.

On February 24, 2026, Ashley Madison announced its global rebrand as a discreet dating app marking the company’s shift away from married dating. As part of the announcement, the company launched a new tagline, “Where Desire Meets Discretion”. The new brand direction puts an emphasis on Ethical Discretion due to the reported increase in single members joining the platform, as well as a growing societal demand for more digital privacy.

== Business model ==
Unlike Match.com or eHarmony, Ashley Madison's business model is based on credits rather than monthly subscriptions. For a conversation between two members, one of the members, always the man, must pay eight credits to initiate the conversation. Any follow-up messages between the two members are complimentary after starting communication. Ashley Madison also has a real-time chat feature where credits buy a certain time allotment.

The site allows users to hide their account profiles for free. Users looking to delete their accounts, even those made without the individual's consent, are charged a $19 fee. The "full delete" option claims to remove user profiles, all messages sent and received, site usage history, personally identifiable information, and photos. The data disclosures in 2015 revealed that this "permanent deletion" feature did not permanently delete all user data. Instead, even after users had used this feature, some information about them remained in the database, which permitted some "permanently deleted" user accounts to be identified.

== Criticism ==
Trish McDermott, a consultant who helped found Match.com, accused Ashley Madison of being a "business built on the back of broken hearts, ruined marriages, and damaged families". Biderman responded by stating that the site is "just a platform" and a website or a commercial will not convince anyone to commit adultery. According to Biderman, affairs help preserve many marriages.

=== Guarantee ===
Ashley Madison offered a guarantee that users will "find someone": "we GUARANTEE that you will successfully find what you're looking for or we'll give you your money back." To qualify, users had to purchase the most expensive package, send more expensive "priority" messages to 18 unique members each month for three months, send five Ashley Madison gifts per month, and engage in 60 minutes of paid chat per month. Compounding the problem is that "more men than women use the service, with the disparity increasing as they advance in age", and "Men seek sex, while women seek passion." A page on Ashley Madison, entitled "Is Ashley Madison a scam? Is Ashley Madison a fraud?" addressed some of these issues in an attempt to win over prospective customers and teach them best practices for using the site.

Segal and Millership phased out the guarantee feature on July 5, 2016. It no longer appears on the company website, advertising, or promotion.

=== Fake female bot accounts ===
According to Annalee Newitz, editor-in-chief of Gizmodo, who has analyzed the 2015 leaked data, Ashley Madison had over 70,000 bots sending fake female messages to male users. They had previously released an analysis purporting to show that only a minuscule proportion (12,000 out of 5.5 million) of registered female accounts were used on a regular basis, but they have subsequently disavowed this analysis, saying that from the data released there is no way of determining how many women actually used the service. Newitz noted a clause in terms of service which states that "many profiles are for 'amusement only'".

In 2012, the company was sued by former employee Doriana Silva, who stated that in preparation for the launch of the company's Portuguese-language website, she was assigned to create over a thousand bogus member profiles within three weeks to attract paying customers and that this caused her to develop repetitive strain injury. The lawsuit claimed that Silva "developed severe pain in her wrists and forearms", and had been unable to work since 2011. The company countersued, alleging fraud. The company claimed that Silva had been photographed jet-skiing, an unlikely activity for someone who had suffered severe injury to the hands and forearms. Ashley Madison later alleged further that Silva had kept confidential documents and sought to retrieve them. In 2015, the Ontario Superior Court dismissed the case without costs, a result with which Avi Weisman, vice-president and general counsel for Avid Life Media, said the company was "very pleased". The Independent reported that the lawsuit was settled out of court and the company denied that Silva had created any fake accounts.

In July 2016, CEO Rob Segal and newly appointed President James Millership told Reuters that the company had phased out bots by late 2015. Segal shared an independent report by EY (Ernst & Young), which verified the phase-out.

=== Advertising ===
Ashley Madison employed guerrilla marketing techniques to advertise its site. One such technique has been the creation of fake criticism websites filled with ads for Ashley Madison and anonymous testimony that the site is legitimate. For example, the site "AshleyMadisonScams.com" was purchased by Ashley Madison's owner, Avid Life, after CEO Noel Biderman made a throffer to the original webmaster who had set up the site to carry negative reviews of Ashley Madison. Dennis Bradshaw, the owner of "AshleyMadisonScams.com", stated "My girlfriend and I began receiving defamatory, harassing, threatening, and extortionary emails through an anonymous emailing service threatening to defame us both, and insinuating violence and severe emotional distress if my website was not taken down and surrendered at once. In these 'anonymous' emails, information was contained which was only known to myself, my girlfriend, Avid Life Media's Noel Biderman and our attorneys."

Ashley Madison advertised with provocative ads on TV commercials, billboards, and radio. Former CEO Noel Biderman was a relentless self-promoter and appeared frequently on talk shows to defend the website and the morality of infidelity. Ashley Madison has designed their ads for shock value, including the (unauthorized) use of celebrities and politicians with alleged sex scandals, and the resultant media coverage generates considerable exposure to their website. TV ads have been pulled from the air in some countries after frequent complaints, which Ashley Madison's ad creators see as successful since it whips up controversy.

Ashley Madison has often been accused of deliberately courting controversy to generate free publicity for its website with its proposed sponsorship. Some proposals turned down by the companies approached include €1.5 million and $11 million jersey sponsorship deals with Italian basketball club Virtus Roma, and Australian National Rugby League team the Cronulla Sharks, respectively, a $10 million offer to rename Phoenix's Sky Harbor Airport and an offer for the naming rights of New Meadowlands Stadium. A statement denouncing proposed ads was made in 2009 when Ashley Madison attempted to purchase CA$200,000 worth of advertising from the Toronto Transit Commission (TTC) on the Toronto streetcar system. With five of six committee members voting against it, the commissioner stated "When it's a core fundamental value around cheating or lying, we're not going to let those kinds of ads go on." Also in 2009, NBC refused an ad submitted by Ashley Madison for the network's broadcast of Super Bowl XLIII.

== Data breach ==
On July 15, 2015, the site was hacked by a group known as The Impact Team. Claiming that its security had always been weak, the hackers claimed to have stolen personal information about the site's user base and threatened to release names, home addresses, search histories, and credit card numbers if the site was not immediately shut down. The demand was driven by the site's policy of not deleting users' personal information following their invoiced requests.

The first release, validated by experts, occurred on August 18. Another release was made on August 20, but a 13 GB file – which allegedly contained the emails of Avid Life Media CEO Noel Biderman – was corrupted. This was corrected on August 21, when the Impact Team dumped Biderman's emails in a separate 19 GB file.

Some users reported receiving extortion emails requesting 1.05 in bitcoin (approximately $225 at the time) to prevent the information from being shared with the user's significant other. Clinical psychologists argued that dealing with an affair in a particularly public way increases the hurt for spouses and children. On August 24, the Toronto Police Department spoke of "two unconfirmed reports of suicides" associated with the leak of customer profiles along with extortion attempts, offering a $500,000 reward for information leading to the arrest of the hackers. At least one suicide previously linked to Ashley Madison has since been reported as being due to "stress entirely related to issues at work that had no connection to the data leak".

CEO Rob Segal said in an interview with the Wall Street Journal that the company was making ongoing investments to enhance privacy and security safeguards, including a partnership with Deloitte's cyber security team. Segal also announced new discreet payment options, including Skrill, Neteller, and Paysafe card.

In August 2015, after its customer records were leaked by hackers, a $576 million class-action lawsuit was filed against the company.

In July 2017, the parent company of Ashley Madison agreed to pay $11.2 million to settle the class action lawsuit filed on behalf of the approximately 37 million users whose personal details were leaked.

== Research ==
Researchers have recruited Ashley Madison users to investigate the psychological factors related to infidelity. A 2023 study found that many Ashley Madison users reported sexual dissatisfaction in their primary relationship. Some of these users had affairs and those who did reported high satisfaction and low regret with their decision. These users reported still maintaining high levels of love and intimacy with their primary partners/spouses.

== In media ==
In May 2024, Netflix released Ashley Madison: Sex, Lies & Scandal, a docuseries that covers the company’s growth from its founding in 2002 to its peak of more than 37 million users, and the aftermath of the 2015 data breach. It explores the company's marketing and security practices, the personal consequences of the breach—including several reported deaths linked to public exposure—and features interviews with former users, company insiders, and journalists.

The website attracted media attention before the data breach. In 2015, a British female journalist went undercover on the site, posing as a married woman, and wrote about the men she met for The Telegraph. In 2016, other reporters from the same newspaper wrote that the site created fake profiles using "fembots" to attract more men to join.

== See also ==
- Comparison of online dating services
- Timeline of online dating
