= The Fold (disambiguation) =

The Fold is an American indie rock band.

The Fold may also refer to:

- The Fold (brand), a British womenswear fashion label
- The Fold (novel), a 2008 novel by An Na
- The Fold: Leibniz and the Baroque, a book by Gilles Deleuze

== See also ==
- Above the fold, the upper half of the front page of a newspaper or tabloid where an important news story or photograph is often located
- Fold (disambiguation)
