= Sanbot =

Service robot by Qihan Technology Co. Ltd

- Manufacturer: Qihan Technology Co. Ltd.
- Country: China
- Year of creation: 2016 prototype
- Type: Humanoid robot
- Purpose: Retail, Hospitality, Education, Health care, Entertainment and Security
- Website: Official website

Sanbot is an intelligent, cloud-enabled service robot developed by Qihan Technology Co. Ltd., a robotics and AI company who has their headquarters in Shenzhen, China. Qihan has launched three generations of intelligent robots under the Sanbot brand – Sanbot Elf (QIHAN Technology renamed the first generation Sanbot to Sanbot Elf,) Sanbot King Kong and Sanbot Nano.

== Development history ==
Sanbot was first introduced to the public at the Internationale Funkausstellung (IFA) in Berlin in 2016. The initial model, later known as Sanbot Elf, featured capabilities like voice recognition, interactive touchscreens, and the ability to perform tasks such as greeting and assisting customers. Sanbot Elf was deployed in various applications, including customs and airport services at locations such as Gongbei Port of Entry and Shenzhen Bao'an International Airport, where it was used for passenger service and security purposes.

QIHAN Technology continued to innovate with the release of Sanbot King Kong at the 2017 World Robot Conference in Beijing, and its introduction to the North American market at CES 2018. The Sanbot King Kong model was designed to move at speeds up to five meters per second and tow up to 165 pounds.

Sanbot Nano, another iteration designed for home use, was launched in 2017 at the IFA Expo in Berlin. Sanbot Nano integrated Amazon's Alexa Voice Service, allowing users to control home appliances through voice commands.

== Variants & Design ==
=== Sanbot Elf ===
The Elf has 360 perception. The robot also is able to use Voice Interaction & localization, Facial Recognition, Video Chat, Obstacle Avoidance, and Auto charging.

==== Components ====
Sanbot robot adopts components and systems from other international tech companies for its hardware and software. The forward cameras are from Sony, and touchscreen from Sharp. IBM Watson powers the artificial intelligence capabilities, and Nuance provides the voice recognition.

==== Specifications ====
Sanbot Elf
Dimensions	Height: 902 millimetres (36 in); Depth: 331 millimetres (13 in); Width: 421 millimetres (17 in)
Weight	19 kilograms (42 lb)
Battery	Lithium-ion battery Capacity: 20Ah/300W; Running time(Full Loading): about 4 Hours; Standby for over 10 hours
Display	10.1 inch 1080P HD capacitance 10-point touch display
Head	Mic x 7, RGB Camera x 2, 3D sensor x 1, Touch sensor x 7
Body	Gyroscope sensor x 1, Induction sensor x 2, IR obstacle sensor x 1, IR message sensor x 6, Touch sensor x 4, Electronic compass x 1
Hands	IR obstacle sensor x 4, Touch sensor x 2
Legs	IR obstacle sensor x 10, Omni Wheel x 3
Moving parts	Head: 2 x DOF, 180 degree at horizontal direction, 30 degree at vertical direction Hand: 1x2(L/R) DOF, 270 degree swing back and forth Leg: 3 x DOF, Free angle
Video	8.0MP HD camera 1.0MP HD color camera with 140 degree aspheric surface angle
Display	10.1 inch 1080P HD capacitance 10-point touch display
Projection	Laser: 1920 x 720; HD wide gamut output: 60 Hz; Aspect-ratio: 16:9
Platform	ROS1.1
Sound	Voice control, 360 degree sound localization 2 x tweeter, 1 x woofer
Networking	Wi-Fi: IEEE 802.11 a/b/g/n (2.4 GHz/5 GHz） Wireless: Bluetooth4.0, ZigBee
Atmosphere lamp	250 customizable colors; 2 cycles for ears, 2 pcs for hands, and 1 cycle for chassis
Moving speed	Up to 2.88 kilometres per hour (2 mph)
Grade	Up to 1.5 centimetres (0.6 in)

=== Sanbot King Kong ===
==== Physical Design ====
Standing at 4.8 feet (1.5 m) tall, Sanbot King Kong has two bionic arms and hands that provide degrees of freedom similar to a human arm. Its waist can change the body’s center of gravity and adjust its posture, for carrying objects on uneven terrain. Sanbot King Kong features a four-wheel drive system with an external wheel motor and Mecanum wheel chassis design achieving speeds up to 5 metres per second (18 km/h). Sanbot King Kong can tow up to 165 pounds.

==== Hardware & Software ====
Sanbot King Kong has six built-in microphones in its head and a speech recognition program that can separate background noise in busy or loud areas. With an AI system powered by IBM Watson and Nuance, Sanbot King Kong is capable of speech recognition and can identify and communicate in 26 different languages. Sanbot King Kong has 3D cameras vSLAM (vision simultaneous localization and mapping), combining infrared, ultrasound and visual obstacle avoidance technology to allow Sanbot King Kong to map out unfamiliar environments and avoid glass doors and falling objects. Sanbot King Kong has a security password system on its head to protect the robot from unwanted access to its USB ports and power-supply ports.

==== Specifications ====
Sanbot King Kong
Dimensions	Height: 1,455 millimetres (57 in); Depth: 765 millimetres (30 in); Width: 615 millimetres (24 in)
Weight	100 kilograms (220 lb)
Battery	Lithium-ion battery Capacity: 36V/1.6KW; Running time(Full Loading): about 18 hours
Display	10.1 inch 1080P HD capacitance 10-point touch display
Degrees of Freedom	Head x 3, Arm x 10, Palm x 10, Foot x 4
Moving	4-wheel drive External wheel motor and Mecanum wheel
Vertical Jump	1.77 in/4.5 cm
Platform	Android/Linux/ROS/RTOS
Head	Microphone x7, Eye Display: OLED x 2, Background lights: RGB X 2, Speakers: Tweeter x2, Degrees of movement x 3, HD camera (720P) x 1, Visual Camera x 1, 3D Camera x 1, Lighting: LED Light x 1, Touch Sensor x 1
Torso	10.1-inch 1080P touch screen, HD Camera x 1, PIR x 2, Ultrasonic sensor x 2, Speakers Tweeter x 2, Touch sensor x 2 Backside Cover: Type-A USB x 2, Micro USB x 1, Dial Switch x 2 Front Side Cover: AC 220 V Power Outlet x 1, HDMI Port x 1, Type-A USB x 1, DC 12 V Port x 1, RJ45 Ethernet Port x 1, AUDIO IN Port x 1, I2C Interface x 1 Support Frame: Pressure transducer x1
Arm (x2)	Degrees of Freedom x 5, Touch Sensor x 4, Infrared Distance Sensor x 3, Background Light x 1
Chassis	External Wheel Hub Motor x 4, Mecanum Wheel x 4, Infrared Distance Sensor x 18, Ultrasonic Sensor x 6, 3D Camera x 4, Vision Camera x 1, Subwoofer x 1, Drawbar x 1, On/Off Switch x 1, Charging Port x 1, Charging Indicator Light x 1, Turn Signal x 3, Magnetic Sensor x 2, RFID x 1, RJ45 Ethernet Port x 1, DC 12V Port x 1, AUDIO IN Port x 1
Moving speed	Up to 18 kilometres per hour (11 mph)
Max Freight Weight	75 kilograms (165 lb)

=== Sanbot Nano ===
Sanbot Nano stands at 2.7 feet tall and is equipped with over 50 sensors to avoid objects in its way, recognize voices and know when someone enters the room. Sanbot Nano inherits popular features from Sanbot Elf including the Android SDK, Sanbot App Store and automatic charging. It adopts Amazon’s Alexa (Alexa Voice Service) and families can use it to control lights, thermostats and home appliances. It is the first home robot adopting the Amazon Alexa AI system.

==== Specifications ====
Sanbot Nano
Dimensions	Height: 848 millimetres (33 in); Depth: 395 millimetres (16 in); Width: 421 millimetres (17 in)
Weight	19 kilograms (42 lb)
Battery	Lithium-ion battery Capacity: 20Ah/300W; Running time(Full Loading): about 4 Hours; Standby for over 10 hours
Display	10.1 inch 1080P HD capacitance 10-point touch display
Head	Mic x 7, RGB Camera x 2, 3D sensor x 1, Touch sensor x 7
Body	Gyroscope sensor x 1, Human body induction sensor x 2, IR evading obstacle sensor x 1, IR message receiving sensor x 6, Touch sensor x 4, electronic compass sensor x 1
Hands	IR evading obstacle sensor x 4, Touch sensor x 2
Legs	IR evading obstacle sensor x 10, Omni Wheel x 3
Moving parts	Head: 2 x DOF, 180 degree at horizontal direction, 30 degree at vertical direction Hand: 1x2(L/R) DOF, 270 degree swing back and forth Leg: 3 x DOF, Free angle
Video	8.0MP HD camera 1.0MP HD color camera with 140 degree aspheric surface angle
Display	10.1 inch 1080P HD capacitance 10-point touch display
Platform	ROS1.1
Sound	Voice control, 360 degree sound localization 2 x tweeter, 1 x Subwoofer
Networking	Wi-Fi: IEEE 802.11 a/b/g/n (2.4 GHz/5 GHz） Wireless: ZigBee
Atmosphere lamp	250 kinds customized colors; 2 cycles for ears, 2 pcs for hands, and 1 cycle for chassis
Moving speed	Up to 2.88 kilometres per hour (2 mph)
Grade	Up to 1.5 centimetres (0.6 in)

== See also ==
- Robot
- Service robot
- Musio
- Pepper (robot)
- Nao (robot)
- Educational robotics
- Justin (robot)
- Surena (robot)
