= Folder =

A file folder is a folded sheet that holds loose sheets of paper.

Folder may also refer to:

== Art, entertainment, and media ==
- Folder (group), a J-pop group
- Folder 5, a spinoff group from the J-pop group Folder
- Folder (band), an Italian nu metal band from Bologna

== Computing ==
- Folder (computing), a virtual container within a digital file system, in which groups of files and other folders can be kept and organized, a.k.a. list of files
- FOLDER (disk compression), a disk compression component of PTS-DOS

== Technology and transportation ==
- Clothes folder, a folding machine for laundry
- Folding bicycle, a bicycle which can be folded for compactness
- Folding kayak, a kayak which can be folded for compactness
- Folding machine, a machine used for folding paper
- Short Folder, a series of aeroplanes designed with folding wings for shipborne use (from 1913)
- Bone folder, a tool used to fold paper and similar materials by hand

== See also ==
- Folding (disambiguation)
- Presentation folder
