= Linen (disambiguation) =

Linen is a textile made from the fibers of the flax plant, Linum usitatissimum.

Linen or linens may also refer to:

- Linen, a shade of the color white
- Linen clothes
- Linen-press, a type of cabinet
- Linens, fabric household goods and clothing items
- Linens 'n Things, an online retailer
