= White Box Robotics =

Robotics company

- Industry: Robotics
- Founded: 2000
- Founder: Thomas Burick,
- Products: Robots
- Website: www.whiteboxrobotics.com

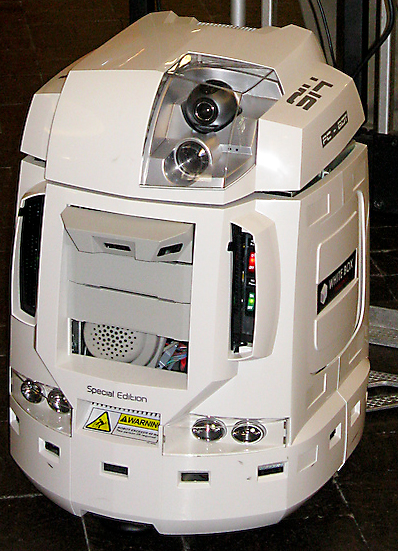
914 PC-Bot

White Box Robotics was founded in 2000 by Thomas Burick.

In 2005, White Box was acquired by Frontline Robotics of Ottawa, Ontario, Canada and in working together the company designed, developed, manufactured and launched the 914 PC-BOT the first of the 9-series robots, a general service robot designed for digital life in the home, at work and at play. Released to early market in December, 2006 and shown as part of the Digital Life Show in New York the 914 PC-BOT won "Best of Show: Future Technology" award.

In 2007 a strategic partnership between Heathkit and White Box Robotics, South Korea was formed to sell the HE-RObot a badge-engineered version of the 914 PC-Bot

In 2014 the PC-Bot line was discontinued after Cohort Systems Inc's acquisition of White Box Robotics and Frontline Robotics.

== Products ==
- 914 PC-Bot
  - Heath HE-RObot badge-engineered version
