= Autonav =

Autonav can refer to:

- in robotics it is short for automated navigation, which is the ability for a vehicle to dynamically plan a path to a destination without human intervention. Automated navigation is a more sophisticated capability than automated guidance which typically follows pre-programmed routes. Advanced implementations of automatic navigation for autonomous vehicles will include obstacle avoidance.
- the NASA autonomous spacecraft navigation software, e.g. as used on Deep Space 1 spacecraft.
- the autonomous rover navigation/driving software used on the NASA Curiosity Mars rover (Mars Science Laboratory)
