= Laundry-folding machine =

Machine which folds clothes

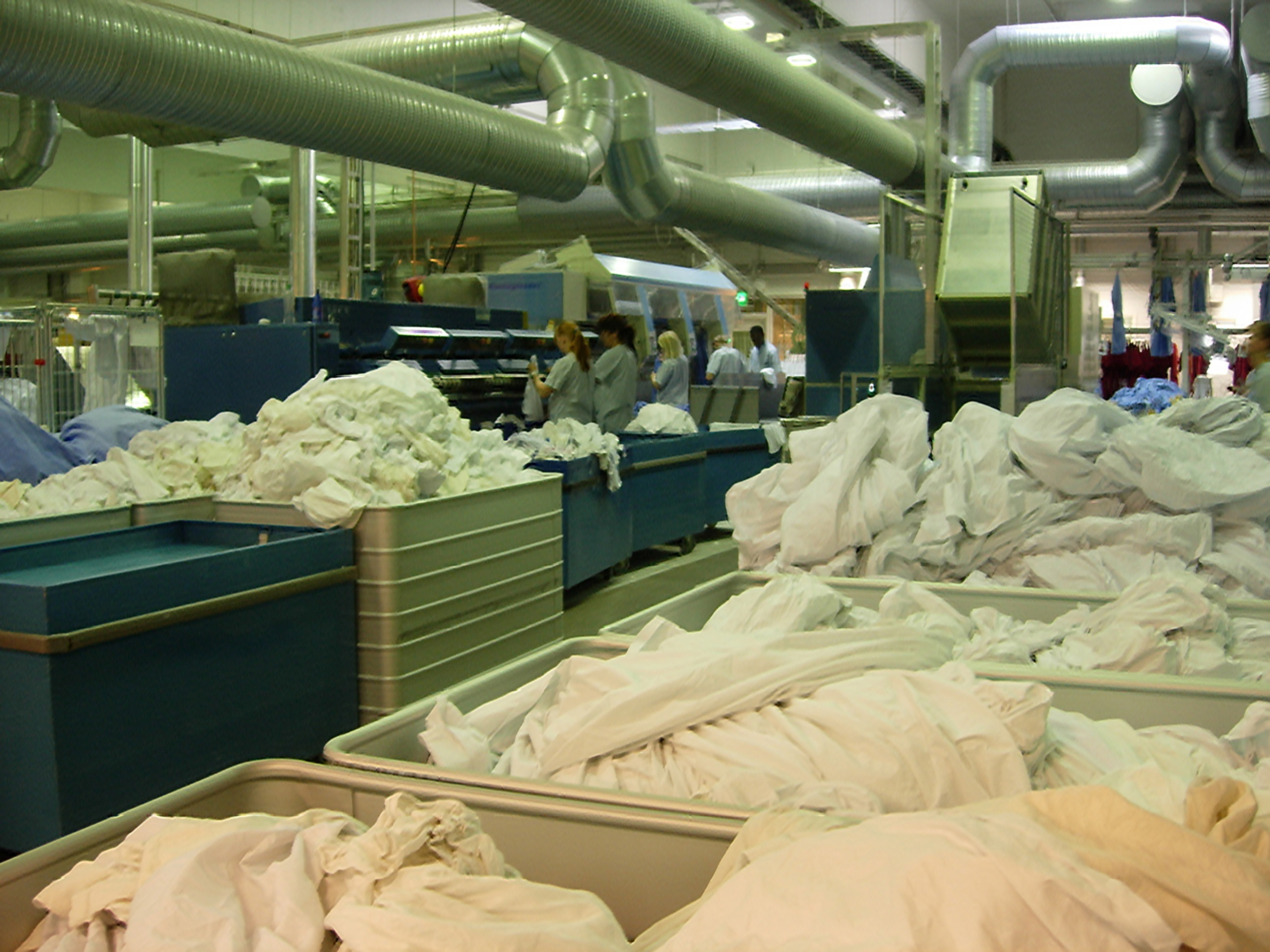
An industrial laundry folding machine with manual feeding.

A laundry-folding machine or laundry-folding robot is a machine or domestic robot which folds apparel such that they can be stored compactly and orderly.

A laundry folding machine can be a part of or integrated with a washing machine, clothes dryer, ironing machine and/or wardrobe. Some operate these processes autonomously, while other require varying degrees of manual intervention.

== Industrial use ==
For industrial use, there are several types of laundry folding machines in different sizes and varieties, of which some are very specialized for certain types of clothing, or very large to be able to fold large textiles such as bedding.

== Domestic use ==
There have been several attempts to produce commercial clothes folding machines for home use.

FoldiMate was an American company founded in 2010, which presented a prototype of a clothes folding machine first in 2016, then at the Consumer Electronics Show in 2017, and an updated prototype at CES in 2018. The garments had to be manually fed into the machine from top one at a time, and after a few minutes the user could pick up ready-made clothes at the bottom. Their goal was for FoldiMate to enter the market by the end of 2019, but in July 2021 it became clear that the company would cease its operations.

Laundroid was a Japanese combined washing and folding machine that aimed at being able to wash, dry, iron and fold clothes, and then transport them to an integrated wardrobe - completely autonomously, with an estimated working duration being overnight. It was first shown at the consumer electronics exhibition show CEATEC in 2015, and was marketed as the world's first robot that could wash and fold clothes. The goal was for Laundroid to enter the market in 2017 (later adjusted to 2019), but in 2019 the company behind Laundroid, Seven Dreams, announced that they had gone bankrupt. The development had been supported by amongst others Daiwa House and Panasonic.

== See also ==
- Clothes dryer
- Clothes horse
- Clothes hanger
- Smart home
- Walk-in closet
- Washing machine
