= Posha (company) =

American kitchen-robotics company

- Type: Private
- Industry: Home robotics; kitchen appliances
- Founded: 2017
- Founder: Raghav Gupta
- Headquarters: San Francisco, California, United States
- Products: Counter-top cooking robot
- Website: posha.com

Posha (formerly Nymble) is an American home-robotics company that manufactures an artificial-intelligence–powered countertop cooking appliance of the same name.

== History ==
Engineer Raghav Gupta founded the company in 2017 after experimenting with a robotic arm to replicate home-style Indian cooking. Early prototypes were tested in Bosch's startup accelerator, leading the team to switch from a free-moving arm to an enclosed countertop appliance.

The company first presented its product under the name Nymble at CES 2024. Later, they renamed the company from Nymble to Posha in May 2025, and announced a US$8 million Series A led by Accel.

== Product and technology ==
The Posha robot is roughly the size of a large microwave. Four ingredient hoppers, a spice carousel, and an induction cooktop sit under a top-mounted camera that guides the cooking process through computer-vision models. Users load chopped ingredients, choose a recipe from the built-in tablet or companion app, and the machine dispenses, stirs, and adjusts heat automatically.

Early reviews noted the robot's ability to reduce hands-on cooking time from about an hour to roughly ten minutes, while criticising its US$1,500–1,750 price tag and limited ingredient capacity. TechCrunch characterised the product as "a coffee machine for food", highlighting its tolerance for ingredient substitutions. As of 2025, the recipe library contained more than 500 dishes across ten cuisines, with new dishes generated by an in-house culinary team and validated through user feedback.

== Funding ==
- Seed and angel rounds (2019–2023) – undisclosed
- Series A, US$8 million (May 2025) led by Accel, with participation by Xeed Ventures, Waterbridge Ventures, and Flipkart co-founder Binny Bansal.

== See also ==
- Domestic robot
- Thermomix
