= Laundroid =

Laundry-folding machine and home robot

Laundroid was a laundry-folding machine and home robot, used to automatically wash, dry, iron, sort and fold clothes to a dedicated closet. It was dubbed to be the world's first laundry folding robot, and was planned to go on sale in Japan first, and subsequently, in a limited number, in the United States. Release date was set to 2017, with pre-orders starting in March 2017.

== Performance ==
Its image-recognition system and robotic arms took 3 to 10 minutes to pick and fold each item, or overnight for a load of laundry.

== History ==
The Laundroid was first introduced and demonstrated at the 2015 CEATEC consumer electronics show in Tokyo, Japan. It was jointly developed by Daiwa House, Panasonic, and Seven Dreamers.

In November 2016, Seven Dreamers announced it has secured an extra $60 million in Series B Funding led by Panasonic Corp., Daiwa House Industry Co., and SBI Investment Co.

The first machines would only be able to fold the clothes for the closet, but the final product – full wash, dry and fold system – was planned to be released in 2019.

On April 23, 2019, Seven Dreamers announced bankruptcy. They had $20 million in debt to 200 creditors according to credit research agency Teikoku Databank.

== See also ==
- FoldiMate
- Domestic robots
- Home automation
- Combo washer dryer
