= Folding machine =

Machine used for folding paper

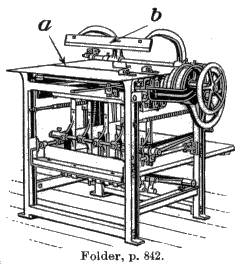
A folding machine

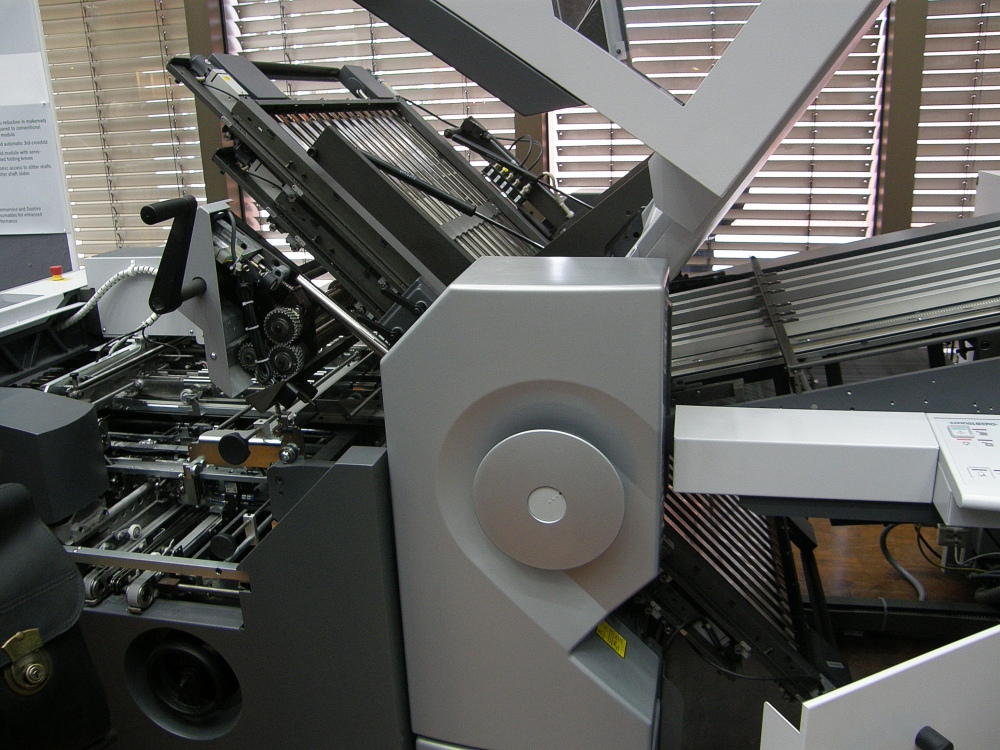
Buckle folding machine

A folding machine is a machine used primarily for the folding of paper. Folding is the sharp-edged bending of paper webs or sheets under pressure at a prepared or unprepared bending point along a straight line according to specified dimensions and folding layouts. Paper can be folded with either a buckle or a knife; thus, there are generally three types of folding machines: buckle folders, knife folders or a combination of these two types. Whilst buckle folding is the more popular of the two methods, knife folding is sometimes preferable. Folding machine models vary in sophistication, with high-end machines capable of processing more complex folding jobs and unusual paper forms (in terms of density and size). Organizations required to undertake mass mail-out campaigns often employ folding machines to improve efficiency. However it is very commonly used finishing process across the printing industry.

== Buckle folders ==
Illustration of buckle folding machine configuration

Buckle folders work by feeding in paper via high friction rollers until it hits a stop and cannot be pushed in further; the reaction of the paper is to buckle. Another pair of rollers grips the buckled portion of the paper and pulls it through. The paper is squeezed between the rollers in the process which results a fold.

== Knife folders ==
Knife folding process principle

A knife folder works by striking the paper with a knife between two rollers. This knife is not sharp enough to cut through the paper and simply strikes and creases the paper along the line where the fold is required. Ideally, knife folding is used with thick paper, for "cross folds" (commonly employed for maps and also known as a "French fold") or if the paper has been stitched during the folding process; stitched sheets can ruin high friction rollers.

== Plow folders ==
A plow folding machine works with a metal strip or a couple of brushes. The paper is forced to fold because of the shape of the strip or how the brushes are placed; after the paper is folded a wheel presses the folded edge for a better fold.

== Paper folders ==
Folding machines exclusively used for folding paper are commonly referred to as paper folders. These machines are typically used for creating letter folds (C Folds) and accordion folds (Z Folds). Other commonly used folds include a half fold, fold-out, double parallel fold, gate (brochure) fold, and right angle fold.

The fold type in a buckle folder is set by adjusting folding plates. Most paper folders allow for a wide range of fold types. Right angle folds require the paper to rotate 90 degrees also known as an 8-page or a right angle. More folds can be accomplished by the use of a 16-page and 32-page unit.

Entry-level paper folders require that the folding plates be adjusted manually, with fold settings specified on the folding plates. Higher-end paper folders will electronically adjust the folding plates for added precision and convenience. Both usually have fine tuning knobs for precise adjustments.

Most paper folders push paper into the machine by use of a friction wheel; this grabs paper using friction. Friction-feed paper folders do not work well with glossy paper as the friction wheel slips on the paper's surface. Pneumatic paper folders are preferable for folding glossy paper. Due to rarity they've made their way in to collector archives for obsolete office equipment. Alongside fax machines and paper drills, they are known for being inefficient in the modern workplace.

=== Pneumatic folding machines ===
Pneumatic paper folders push paper into the machine using a vacuum. These folders are often referred to as air-powered paper folders. This method makes it possible to fold most types of paper. Most pneumatic paper folders include a built-in compressor. These folders can have as many as sixteen folding plates or several knife folds depending on the imposition, these are adjusted manually or electronically, depending on the machine.

=== Feeding systems ===
There are two types of feeding systems used by folders: pile and continuous. The first is flat pile, in which the paper is placed on a feeding table and each sheet is then transported into the machine by friction or an air-controlled suction-wheel. A variation of this is palletized feeding, in which an entire pallet full of paper may be placed on the feeding table. The second type is called "continuous"; this involves the sheets being skillfully "rolled-out" onto a belt, on a table or rollers. An electric eye controls the belt speed, propelling the paper into the machine, then each sheet is individually pulled into the machine by an air-controlled suction-wheel. The sheets of paper will be separated by blowing air between them.

== Folder inserters ==
Folder inserters are designed for mailing bills, checks and other material. Folder inserters take paper, fold it, insert it into an envelope and seal the envelope. Folder inserters are available in several designs, many equipped with multiple feed trays for several sheets of paper. Many have the ability to include inserts and return envelopes. These are mixtures of knife and buckle folders.

== Folder sealers ==
Paper folder sealers are used to fold special pressure-sensitive paper. As the paper is folded, pressure rollers roll along the edge of the paper, bursting open tiny glue pockets that seal the letter shut. Pressure sealed documents are typically opened by tearing off a perforated side or tearing open the sealed portion of the letter. Documents that have been folded and sealed do not require an envelope for mailing and are often used for mailing bills, invoices and other mailed documents.

== Typical folding schemes ==
Letterfold

Concertina

Gate-fold

Crossfold

== Process videos ==
Buckle folder

Knife folder

== Other types of folding machines ==
=== Clothes folder ===
A clothes folder is a device or a machine for folding garments. Clothes folders range from hand operated boards with hinges to automatic folding machines of various sizes. There are several industrial variants of clothes folding machines, with some being highly specialized for certain types of clothes, or very large to accommodate large textiles such as bedding. Some modern industrial folding and filling machines are fully automated, improving speed, efficiency, and accuracy in production lines. Examples of commercial clothes folders for domestic use include FoldiMate and Laundroid, which only work for smaller clothes, and not larger items such as bedding.

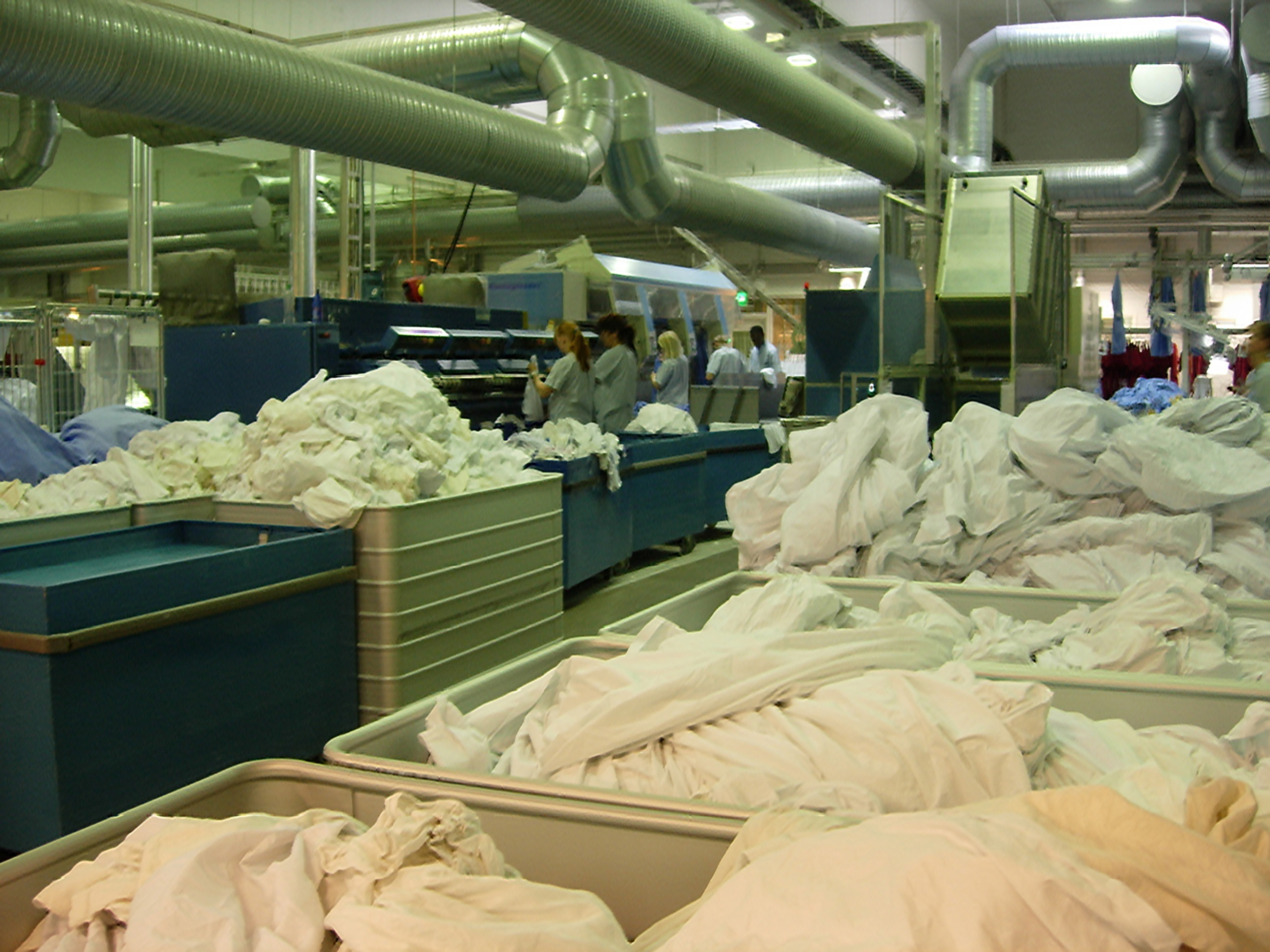
Industrial clothes folders

== See also ==
- Book folding
- Printing
