= Walk-in closet =

Type of wardrobe or dressing room

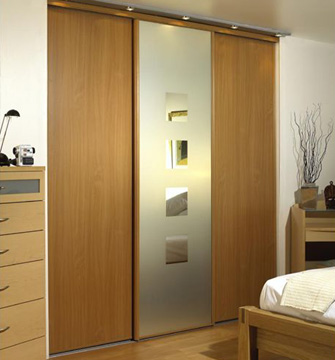
Reach-in closet with sliding doors

A walk-in closet (North American) or walk-in wardrobe (UK) or dressing room is typically a large closet, wardrobe or room that is primarily intended for storing clothes, footwear etc., and being used as a changing room. As the name suggests, walk-in closets are closets sufficiently big as to allow one to walk into them to browse through the items. It is often a small room with wall-mounted cabinet, shelf and drawers, and these can either be with or without doors (for example sliding doors). Walk-in closets often do not have doors in front of shelves, which can give a better overview of the clothes, but also leads to more dust. When the walk-in closet is large enough for dressing and undressing, the wardrobe is often also equipped with one or more mirrors. The room should also have good lighting, and a bench or chair can be handy. A dressing table is sometimes also found in the walk-in closet, and such dual use can relieve congestion around other rooms such as bathrooms.

One advantage of a walk-in closet is that it makes it possible to collect most clothes in one room, which can relieve space in the other rooms in the house. Conversely, however, an extra room would often be needed for the walk-in closet. Walk-in closets are generally thought of as being a luxury feature seen in wealthier homes.

== History ==
Ancient Roman soldiers were among the first developers of the modern-day walk-in closet when they invented the armarium, a wooden box for the use of transporting weapons and armour to every military camp.

The first walk-in closet was developed in the Kingdom of France in the storing of weapons and art techniques. In the 18th century, pieces became the common way to store clothing, along with shelves and drawers, which usually featured a hanging section for cloaks and other long garments.

For the first time, in the 1870s, the hanging rod was incorporated in the walk-in closet. The Dakota, a luxurious apartment in New York City, broke ground in 1880, when it featured some of the United States' first reach-in closets specifically designed for clothes.

In the 1950s, the walk-in closet gained popularity in the middle and lower class houses, particularly in suburban residential areas.

== See also ==
- Clothes valet
- Clothes hanger
- Ironing board
- Laundry-folding machine
