= Folding =

Fold, folding or foldable may refer to:

== Arts, entertainment, and media ==
- Fold (album), the debut release by Australian rock band Epicure
- Fold (poker), in the game of poker, to discard one's hand and forfeit interest in the current pot
- "Folded" (song), by Kehlani
- "Fold", a song by Trust Company from True Parallels (2005)
- Above the fold and below the fold, the positioning of news items on a newspaper's front page according to perceived importance
- Paper folding, or origami, the art of folding paper

== Science, technology, and mathematics ==
=== Biology ===
- Protein folding, the physical process by which a polypeptide folds into its characteristic and functional three-dimensional structure
  - Folding@home, a powerful distributed-computing project for simulating protein folding
- Fold coverage, quality of a DNA sequence
- Skin fold, an area of skin that folds

=== Computing ===
- Code folding, a technique used by full screen and GUI editors
- Fold (higher-order function), a type of programming operation on data structures
- fold (Unix), a computer program used to wrap lines to fit in a specified width
- Folding (DSP implementation), a transformation technique using in DSP architecture implementation
- Folding (signal processing), an aspect of aliasing
- Folding editor, a text editor that supports text folding or code folding, allowing the user to hide and reveal blocks of text
- Case folding is the conversion of letter case in a string
- Constant folding, a compiler optimization technique
- Folding@home, a powerful distributed-computing project for simulating protein folding

=== Electronics ===
- Foldable display
- Flexible display

=== Other uses in science and mathematics ===
- Fold (geology), one or a stack of originally flat and planar surfaces that are bent or curved as a result of plastic deformation
- Folding (chemistry), the process by which a molecule assumes its shape or conformation
- Folding (Dynkin diagram), in Lie theory, a way of obtaining one Dynkin diagram from another
- Fold change, a measure of the difference between two quantities
- e-folding, exponential growth or decay
- Polygon folding, or polyhedron folding
- HD 109246 b or Fold, an exoplanet

== Other uses ==
- Amicus Therapeutics, NASDAQ stock trading symbol FOLD
- Book folding, in book production
- Foldable smartphone, a smartphone with a folding form factor
- Folding bicycle, a bicycle designed to fold into a compact form
- Folding bridge, a bridge that can be folded, mainly to open for higher boats
- Folding clothes, allows apparel to be stored compactly, prevents unwanted creasing, preserves wanted creases, and presents them in a pleasing manner, for instance when displayed on sale in stores
- Pen (enclosure), or sheep fold, a sheep pen in British English
- -fold, a feature in British toponymy
- Samsung Galaxy Fold, a smartphone
- Scottish Fold, a cat breed

== See also ==
- Bend (disambiguation)
- Crease (disambiguation)
- Folder (disambiguation)
