= The Fold (brand) =

British womenswear fashion label

The Fold London
- Industry: Clothing
- Founded: 2012
- Founder: Polly McMaster
- Website: https://thefoldlondon.com

The Fold London is a British womenswear fashion label providing luxury business attire, and describes itself as offering "the feminine alternative to the Savile Row suit". The brand is London-based, with a large retail store in Belgravia, London.

== History ==
The company was founded in 2012 by British entrepreneur Polly McMaster, a former finance executive. McMaster is an alumnus of London Business School, and was included in the Management Today list of "35 under 35". The Fold is backed by Active Partners, with Nick Evans (founder of Evans Cycle) leading the board of investors.

The company began by offering a "semi-bespoke" service from a studio and workshop in London's Clerkenwell, and this facility had closed by the time the first store had opened in 2018.

Their first store opened in March 2018, a 1,400 sq ft space in a grade II listed building in Cadogan Place, in London's Belgravia. The store's interior design was created by the all women London-based firm KKD.

In August 2018, Tatler included The Fold in its "Chic, smart and British: The 5 workwear brands to stock up on this autumn", and wrote, "corporate dressing doesn't have to be frumpy". The brand has been included in workwear recommendations articles from publications including Marie Claire and Who What Wear.

== Awards and recognition ==
In 2016, The Fold was one of 12 companies selected the by UK luxury brand association Walpole (founded by John Ayton) for its Brands of Tomorrow programme.

For several years, the company has supported Smartworks.org, a charity dedicated to donating free, smart workwear for women going back to work after a period of unemployment, with donations and fundraising activities.

== Notable customers ==
Notable customers include the Duchess of Cambridge, Pippa Middleton, Holly Willoughby, and Samantha Cameron.
