= HERO (robot) =

Series of domestic robots from the 1980s

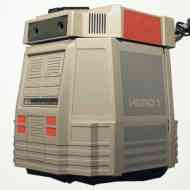
- Hero 1
- Manufacturer: Heathkit
- Type: robot
- Released: 1982
- Discontinued: 2012

HERO (from Heathkit Educational Robot) is a series of several educational robots sold by Heathkit during the 1980s.

The Heath Company began the HERO 1 project in October 1979, with the first release in 1982. Models include the HERO 1, HERO Jr., and HERO 2000. Heathkit supported the HERO robot line until 1995. The units were either sold as assembly kits or prebuilt by Heathkit for an additional fee. The 1980s models are considered collector's items, due to their rarity.

For the most part, they cannot perform practical tasks, but are more geared toward entertainment and education above all.

== HERO 1 (ET-18) ==
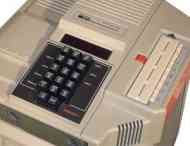
HERO 1's control panel

HERO 1 is a self-contained mobile robot controlled by an onboard computer with a Motorola 6808 CPU and 4 kB of RAM. The robot features light, sound, and motion detectors as well as a sonar ranging sensor. An optional arm mechanism and speech synthesizer was produced for the kit form and included in the assembled form.

To make this power available in a simple way, high-level programming languages were created. For example, the ANDROTEXT language is a HERO 1 editor and compiler developed in 1982 for the IBM PC.

HERO 1 is featured on a few episodes of the children's television program Mr. Wizard's World. Byte magazine called HERO 1 "a product of extraordinary flexibility and function ... If you are interested in robotics, Heath will show you the way".

Release date	1982
Price	Kit US$1500 (equivalent to $5,004.31 in 2025), Assembled US$2,500 (equivalent to $8,340.52 in 2025)
Discontinued	1995
Units sold	14,000 (across 8 years)
Media	Assembly manual, user's manual, technical manual, and speech dictionary
Power	Batteries: four 6-volt gel cell Charger: 120/240 VAC, 50/60 Hz charger
CPU	Motorola 6808
Memory	RAM: 4 kB; Monitor ROM: 2 kB
Storage	Compact Cassette
Display	six 7-segment LEDs
Sound	Votrax SC-01 speech synthesizer (Included with Assembled version and $149.95 option for kit)
Input	Hex keypad with 17 keys
Dimensions	20 inches high x 18 inches wide (50 cm x 45 cm)
Weight	39 pounds (18 kg)

== HERO Jr. (RT-1) ==
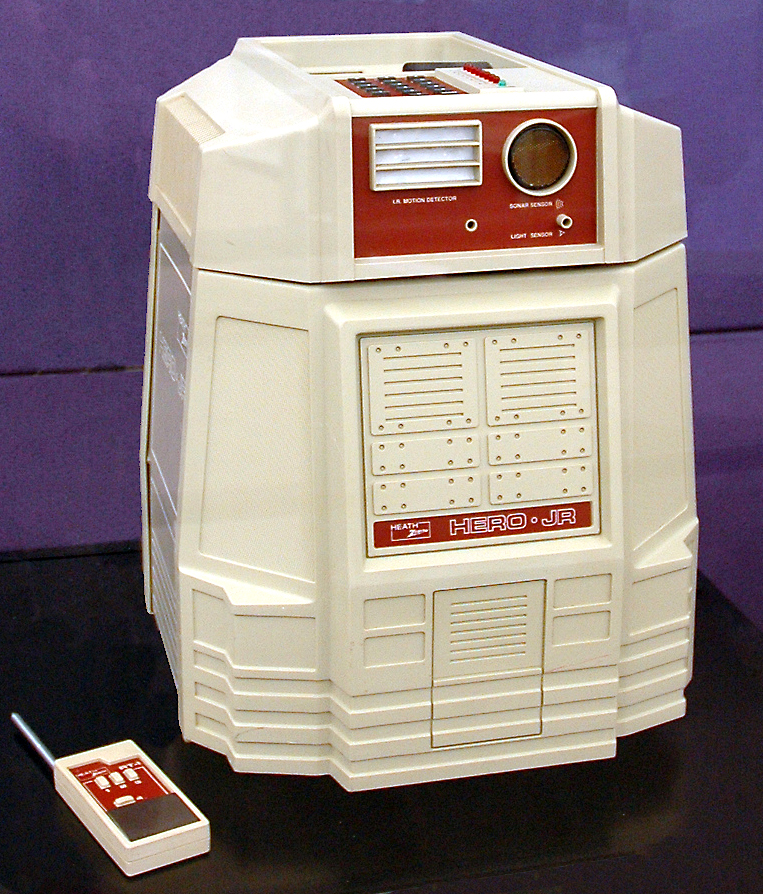
Hero Jr. (with optional remote control)

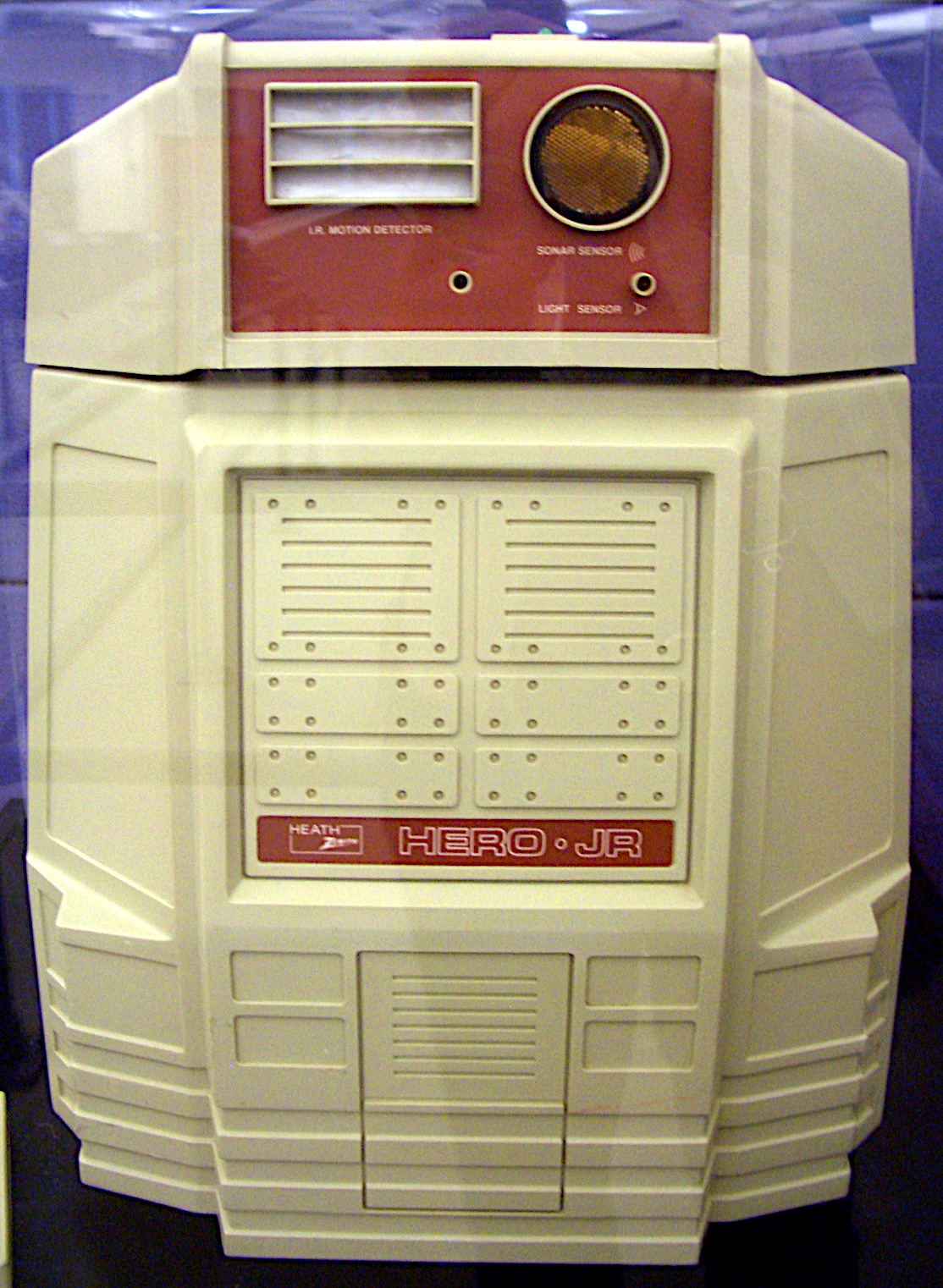
HERO Jr. frontal view

A smaller version called HERO Jr. was released later. Heathkit intended it for the home market, and therefore made it less complex, and more self-contained. Like HERO 1, HERO Jr. has a 6808 processor, but only 2 kB of RAM. It has onboard speech synthesis, a Polaroid sonar range sensor, a light sensor, a sound sensor, and an optional infrared sensor. Other optional components include a pair of extra batteries to double the operational time between charges, from an estimated 4 hours to 8 hours. A remote control accessory allows users to drive the robot around. It includes a motion sensor that causes the robot to croak "SOM-THING-MOVE" when it detects a source of motion.

Heathkit released several add-ons to increase the robot's capabilities, including a transmitter to activate a home security system in the event it senses movement while on "guard duty". Also, additional cartridges with programs and games were produced, as well as a components to allow the user to directly program the robot.

The drive mechanism is backward compared to the HERO 1, with the drive and steering wheel in the back of the robot. The head section features an indentation to allow the robot to transport up to 10 pounds (4.5 kg). The robot can speak several phrases from various films that involve robots or computers. It is capable of remembering and repeating back its master's name, singing songs, reciting poems, acting as an alarm clock, and making its own combinations of phonemes to create a robotic gibberish.

Release date	1984
Price	Kit US$599.95, Assembled US$1000
Discontinued	Before October 1987 (Assembled); 1995 (Kit)
Units sold	4000 (across 8 years)
Power	Batteries:6 V 3.8 A·h x2, x4 optional
CPU	Motorola 6808 1 MHz
Memory	RAM: 2 kB, expandable to 24 kB; Monitor ROM: 32 kB
Display	9 LEDs
Sound	Votrax SC-01 speech synthesizer
Input	Hex keypad with 17 keys
Dimensions	19 inches (48 cm) high
Weight	21.5 pounds (9.8 kg)

== HERO 2000 (ET-19) ==
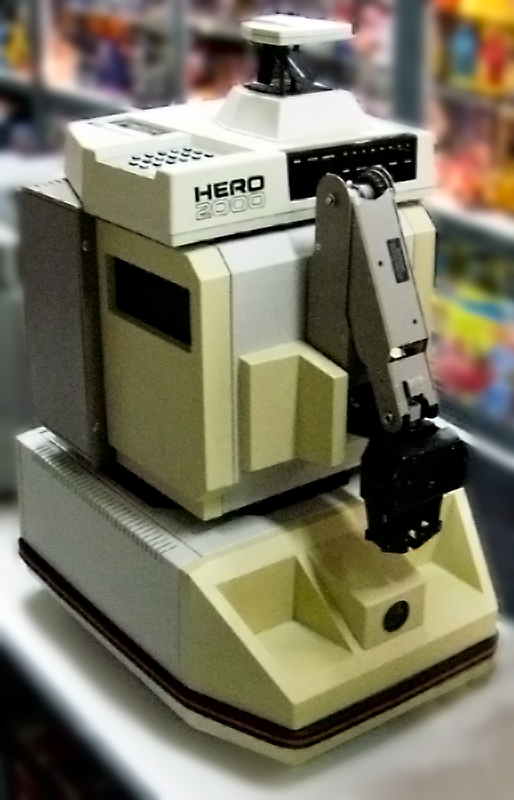
HERO 2000

The much more powerful HERO 2000 includes several onboard microprocessors, onboard speech synthesis, several sensors, and the ability to add expansion cards using a passive backplane.

Release date	1986
Price	Kit US$3,000; Assembled US$4,500
Discontinued	1995
Units sold	3000 (across 8 years)
Power	Battery: single 24 amp-hour battery, Charger: 120 VAC charger included
CPU	Intel 8088 (Main); 6 slave Z-80 processors (11 with optional arm)
Memory	RAM: 24 kB, expandable to 576 kB, Monitor ROM: 64 kB with integrated BASIC
Display	16 head-mounted LED status indicators (eight are user definable); RS-232 serial port
Sound	Silicon Systems SSI 263 (analog formant) speech synthesizer
Input	hexadecimal keypad RS-232 serial port
Dimensions	Height 32 inches (81 cm)
Weight	78 pounds (35 kg)

== HE-RObot ==
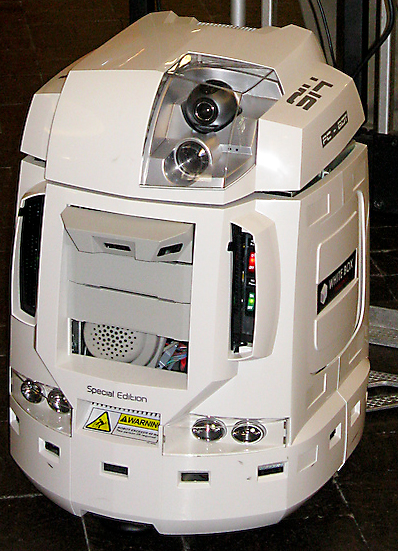
HE-RObot, a badge-engineered version of the 914 PC-Bot (pictured) by White Box Robotics

The HE-RObot is the result of a strategic partnership between Heathkit and White Box Robotics, marketed to the educational market. When available, it cost up to US$8,000. Heathkit sold approximately 50 of these robots before bankruptcy in 2012.

Developer	White Box Robotics
Release date	2007
Price	up to US$8,000
Discontinued	2012
Unitssold	approximately 50
OS	Windows XP Pro
Power	Batteries: 2 x 12V 9Ah Lead Acid Battery; Charger: SONEIL 12V Intelligent Battery Charger (3A)
CPU	Intel Core Duo
Memory	1 GB DDR2 RAM
Storage	80 GB 2½ in. SATA Hard drive
Dimensions	Height 21 inches (53 cm)
Weight	25 kg (55 lb)
Website	www.heathkit.com/herobot.html (Historical)

== See also ==
- 1980s in science and technology
- R.O.B. – Video game console peripheral
- Topo (robot)

== Bibliography ==
- Howard Boyet: Heath's robot "HERO": 68 experiments : fundamentals and applications, Microprocessor Training 1983. ISBN 9994699709
- Mark J. Robillard: HERO 1 - Advanced Programming and Interfacing, H.W. Sams 1983. ISBN 0-672-22165-9
- Howard Boyet: Hero 1 - Advanced Programming Experiments, Heathkit/Zenith 1984. ISBN 0-87119-036-2
- John D. Hubbard, Lawrence P. Larsen: Hero 2000 - Programming and Interfacing, Heathkit/Zenith 1986. ISBN 0-87119-153-9
