= Home automation for the elderly and disabled =

Technological means of improving quality of life for seniors and the disabled

Home automation for the elderly and disabled, also called assistive domotics, focuses on making it possible for older adults and people with disabilities to remain safe and comfortable at home, rather than rely on assisted living. The field of home automation uses much of the same technology and equipment as home automation for security, entertainment, and energy conservation but tailors it for older people and/or people with disabilities.

== Concept ==
There are two basic forms of home automation systems for this purpose: embedded health systems and private health networks. Embedded health systems integrate sensors and microprocessors in appliances, furniture, and clothing which collect data that is analyzed and can be used to diagnose diseases and recognize risk patterns. Private health networks implement wireless technology to connect portable devices and store data in a household health database. According to the Injury Control and Safety Promotion journal, due to the need for more healthcare options for the aging population, "there is a significant interest from industry and policy makers in developing these technologies".

Home automation can be implemented in the homes of older adults and people with disabilities in order to maintain their independence and safety, while also saving the costs and potential anxiety of moving to a health care facility. For those with disabilities, smart homes also provide more opportunities for independence, providing emergency assistance systems, security features, fall prevention, automated timers, and alerts, and also allowing monitoring from family members via an internet connection.

== Telehealth implementation ==
=== Background ===
Telehealth is the use of electronic technology services to provide patient care and improve the healthcare delivery system. The term is often confused with telemedicine, which specifically involves remote clinical services such as diagnosis and monitoring, while telehealth covers a wider range of remote clinical and non-clinical services, including health information technology and preventative care. Telehealth also promotes the diagnosis, treatment, education, and self-management of health away from health care providers and into people's homes.

=== Purpose ===
The goal of telehealth is to complement the traditional healthcare setting. There is an increased demand on the healthcare system from a growing elderly population and shortage of healthcare providers. Many elderly and disabled patients are faced with limited access to health care and providers. Telehealth can help to bridge the gap between patient demand and healthcare accessibility, as well as to decrease healthcare costs and mitigate transportation concerns. For the elderly and disabled populations, telehealth implementation can allow them to stay in the comfort and convenience of their homes while still receiving support.

=== Elderly population ===
Geriatrics is the role of healthcare in providing care to the elderly population. The elderly population may encounter many health complications: according to an analysis by Ronald Merrell, "the main threats are non-communicable diseases, including heart, stroke, cancer, diabetes, hypertension, and dementia". Telehealth may help provide management and monitoring of chronic diseases in patient homes.

There is a variety of devices and technology that can provide monitoring benefits. One telemonitoring device measures vital signs: blood pressure, pulse, oxygen saturation, and weight. Another telemonitoring option is video-conferencing, which can provide patient-provider consultation and electronic delivery of medication instructions and general health information. Studies have been done to analyze the effectiveness of telehealth for the elderly population. Some have found positive effects of telehealth, including reduction of symptoms and self-efficacy in the elderly population with chronic conditions. Other studies have found the opposite effect, where telehealth home care produced greater mortality than the traditional hospital setting. Additional studies have found inconclusive results.

=== Disabled population ===
People with severe functional disabilities are statistically the highest proportion of users of health care services and represent a large portion of health care costs and designated service. Telecommunications technologies may provide a way to meet the healthcare demands of the disabled population. According to research from the National Library of Medicine, "the largest proportion of health care... result from individuals with severe functional disabilities, such as stroke and traumatic brain injury". Patients with functional disabilities may benefit from telehealth care.

According to research from the Journal of American Medical Directors Association (JAMDA), functional limitation refers to the physical or mental conditions which impair, interfere with, or impede one or more of the individual's major life activities and instrumental activities of daily living. Patients with spina bifida, musculoskeletal disorders, mental illness, or neurological disorders may also benefit from telehealth care services. Telehealth technologies include vital sign telemonitoring devices, exercise routines, problem-solving assessments, and therapeutic self-care management tasks. However, telehealth care is a supplement to traditional health care measures, rather than being a complete substitute health care system.

=== Ethical and legal concerns ===
Concerns over telehealth implementation include the limited scope of research that confirms any benefits of telehealth in comparison to traditional healthcare settings. Currently, there is no definitive evidence that telehealth is a superior mode of healthcare delivery. There are also ethical issues about patient autonomy and patient acceptance for telehealth as a mode of healthcare. The lack of face-to-face patient–provider care, in contrast to the direct care of a traditional healthcare setting, is an ethical concern for many.

==== Attempted regulations in Texas ====
In 2015, the Texas Medical Board ruled that state physicians had to physically meet patients before remotely treating ailments or prescribing medication. The telemedicine company Teladoc sued over the rule in Teladoc v. Texas Medical Board, arguing the bill violated antitrust laws by inflating prices and limiting the supply of health care providers in the state. The bill, meant to go active on June 3, 2015, was then stalled. Teladoc voluntarily dropped the lawsuit in 2017, after Texas passed a new bill allowing for remote treatment without a prior in-person interaction, which Teladoc Health had lobbied heavily for. On September 15, 2017, the Texas Medical Board amended its regulations to allow state-licensed healthcare providers to care for patients without requiring face-to-face interaction, potentially affecting up to 28 million patients in Texas.

== Automation systems ==
Home automation for healthcare can range from very simple alerts to expensive computer-controlled network interfaces. Some of the monitoring or safety devices that can be installed in a home include lighting and motion sensors, environmental controls, video cameras, automated timers, emergency assistance systems, and alerts.

=== Emergency assistance systems and tools ===
Emergency assistance for older adults and people with disabilities can be classified into three categories: First, Second, and Third Generation emergency assistance systems or tools.

==== First generation ====
These simple systems and tools include personal alarm systems and emergency response telephones that do not have to be integrated into a smart home system. A typical system consists of a small wireless pendant transceiver to be worn around the neck or wrist. The system has a central unit plugged into a telephone jack, with a loudspeaker and microphone. When the pendant is activated a 24-hour control center is contacted. Generally, the 24-hour control center speaks to the user and identifies that help is required, and emergency services are dispatched. The control center also has information about the user, such as medical symptoms, medication allergies, etc.

The unit has a built in rechargeable battery backup and the ability to notify the control center if the battery is running low or if the system loses power. Modern systems have active wireless pendants that are polled frequently advising battery and signal strength status, as older style pendants could have a battery failure that would rendering the pendant useless when required in an emergency.

==== Second generation ====
These systems and tools generate alarms and alerts automatically if significant changes are observed in the user's vital signs. These systems are usually fully integrated into a home network and allow health professionals to monitor patients at home. The system consists of an antenna that a patient holds over their implanted cardiac device to transmit data for downloading over the telephone line and viewing by the patient's physician. The collected data can be accessed by the patient or family members. Another example of this type of system is a Smart Shirt that measures heart rate, electrocardiogram results, respiration, temperature, and other vital functions and alerts the patient or physician if there is a problem.

==== Third generation ====
These types of systems would help older adults and people with disabilities deal with loneliness and depression by connecting them with other elderly or disabled individuals through the Internet, reducing their sense of isolation.

=== Security ===
In order to maintain the security of the home, many home automation systems integrate features such as remote keyless entry systems which will allow seniors to view who is at the door and then remotely open the door. Home networks can also be programmed to automatically lock doors and shut blinds in order to maintain privacy.

=== Reminder systems ===
Home automation systems may include automatic reminder systems for the elderly. Such systems are connected to the Internet and make announcements over an intercom. They can provide reminders about doctor's appointments and taking medicine, as well as everyday activities such as turning off the stove, closing the blinds, locking doors, etc. Users choose what activities to be reminded of. The system can be set up to automatically perform tasks based on user activity, such as turning on the lights or adjusting room temperature when the user enters specified areas. Other systems can remind users at home or away from home to take their medicine, and how much, by using an alarm wristwatch with text message and medical alert. Reminder systems can also remind about everyday tasks such as eating lunch or walking the dog.

Some communities offer free telephone reassurance services to residents, which includes both safety check calls as well as reminders. These services have been credited with saving the lives of many elderly and senior citizens who choose to remain at home.

=== Medication dispensers ===
Smart homes can implement medication dispensing devices in order to ensure that necessary medications are taken at appropriate times. Automated pill dispensers can dispense only the pills that are to be taken at that time and are locked; versions are available for Alzheimer's patients that have a lock on them. For diabetic patients, a talking glucose monitor allows the patient to check their blood sugar level and take the appropriate injection. Digital thermometers are able to recognize a fever and alert physicians. Blood pressure and pulse monitors dispense hypertensive medications when needed.

=== Home robotics ===
Domestic robots, connected to the domotic network, are included to perform or help in household chores such as cooking or cleaning. Dedicated robots can administer medications and alert a remote caregiver if the patient is about to miss their medicine dose. There are also spoon-feeding robots.

== Challenges ==
The recent advances made in tailoring home automation toward the elderly have generated opposition. It has been stated that, "Smart home technology will be helpful only if it is tailored to meet the individual needs of each patient". This currently creates a problem because many of the interfaces designed for home automation "are not designed to take functional limitations, associated with age, into consideration".

Another problem involves making the system user-friendly for the elderly, who often have difficulty operating electronic devices. The cost of the systems has also presented a challenge, as the U.S. government currently provides no financial assistance to seniors who choose to install these systems (in some countries such as Spain, the Dependency Law includes this assistance).

The biggest concern expressed by potential users of smart home technology is "fear of lack of human responders or the possible replacement of human caregivers by technology", but home automation should be seen as something that augments, but does not replace, human care.

== See also ==
- Assisted living
- Disability robot and domestic robot
- Elderly care
- Floor plans and house navigation system
- Gerontechnology
- Healthcare robot
- Home robot
- Indoor positioning system
- Roujin Z, a film that uses assistive domotics as a central plot device.
- Transgenerational design
