= FoldiMate =

Former Californian Robots Company

FoldiMate, Inc.
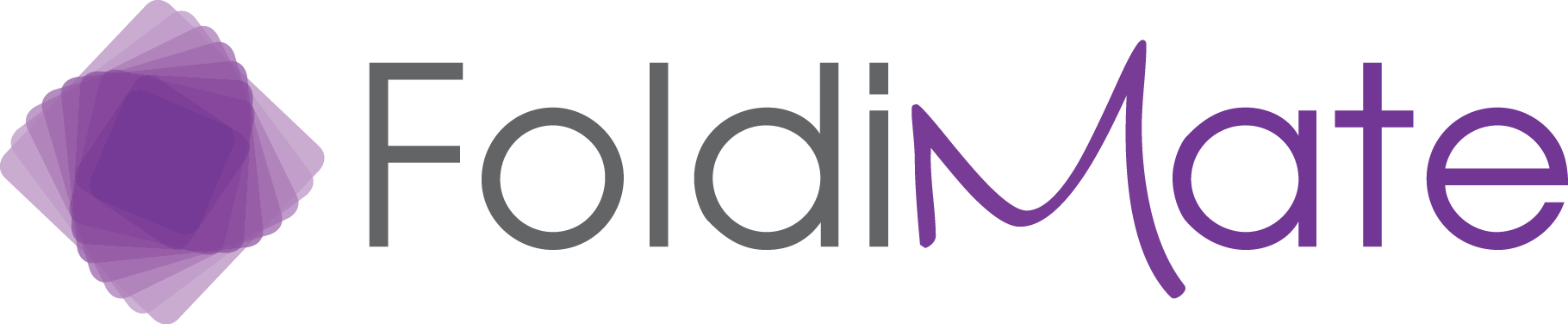
- Type: Privately owned
- Industry: Home automation
- Founded: September 6, 2012; 14 years ago
- Founders: Gal Rozov
- Headquarters: Silicon Valley, California, US
- Products: Laundry folding robot
- Website: foldimate.com at the Wayback Machine (archived 2022-05-22)
- Footnotes; As of 2025, the URL to the original FoldiMate website (foldimate.com) is owned by Miele.

FoldiMate, Inc. is a California-based company founded in 2012 which was developing a robotic laundry-folding machine. Their clothes folding machine was aimed to enter the market by the end of 2019.

== History ==
FoldiMate, Inc. was founded on September 6, 2012, by Gal Rozov, an Israeli software engineer who decided that folding laundry was a tedious chore that could be done effectively by a robot. In 2010, Rozov quit his job as a software developer and product manager and spent two years developing his laundry-folding device. In 2012, he moved to the United States to work with a robotic team in Silicon Valley and he subsequently founded the company. By 2013, he had a patented technology. In the same year, the company ran a Kickstarter campaign that raised $11.818 from a goal of $250.000. In 2016, after an initial round of investment, he produced the first prototype. Around this time, The Telegraph held a poll asking readers whether they "would pay £600 to never fold laundry again", in which 84% of respondent chose the option "Shut up and take my money". The prototype presented at CES 2017 generated much interest.

The company exhibited an updated prototype of Foldimate at CES 2018.

At CES 2019, the company provided a working prototype for the first time.

A commercial version of the machine was available in 2014, while the household version was originally planned for 2017, but was eventually set for release in 2019. The company began taking preoders in 2018 for a deposit of $85. By January 2018, the company had 8.000 pre-order reservations and deposits.

In January 2018, BSH Hausgeräte expressed an interest in partnering with Foldimate.

== FoldiMate (product) ==
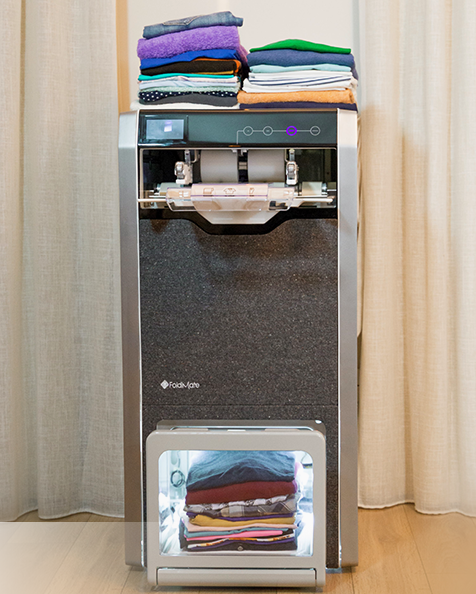
FoldiMate prototype

The FoldiMate is slightly larger than a standard washing machine. According to the developers, it can fold a full wash in less than 4 minutes.

The user clips the piece of clothing on two hooks and the item is pulled into the machine. Then a series of rollers and arms moves in all directions to straighten and fold it. The machine can fold shirts, tops, trousers and dresses, but not small pieces of clothing like underwear or large items like sheets. The folded items are returned in a stack through a window at the bottom of the machine.

Previous versions included anti-wrinkling technology and fragrance features, but the product was redesigned and simplified with the aim of readying it for the market by the end of 2019.

The estimated price tag was said to be between $700 and $980, with the most common price given as $850.

== See also ==
- Domestic technology
- Laundroid, another laundry folding machine
- Domestic robot
- Home automation
