= Linen-press =

Storage unit for textiles

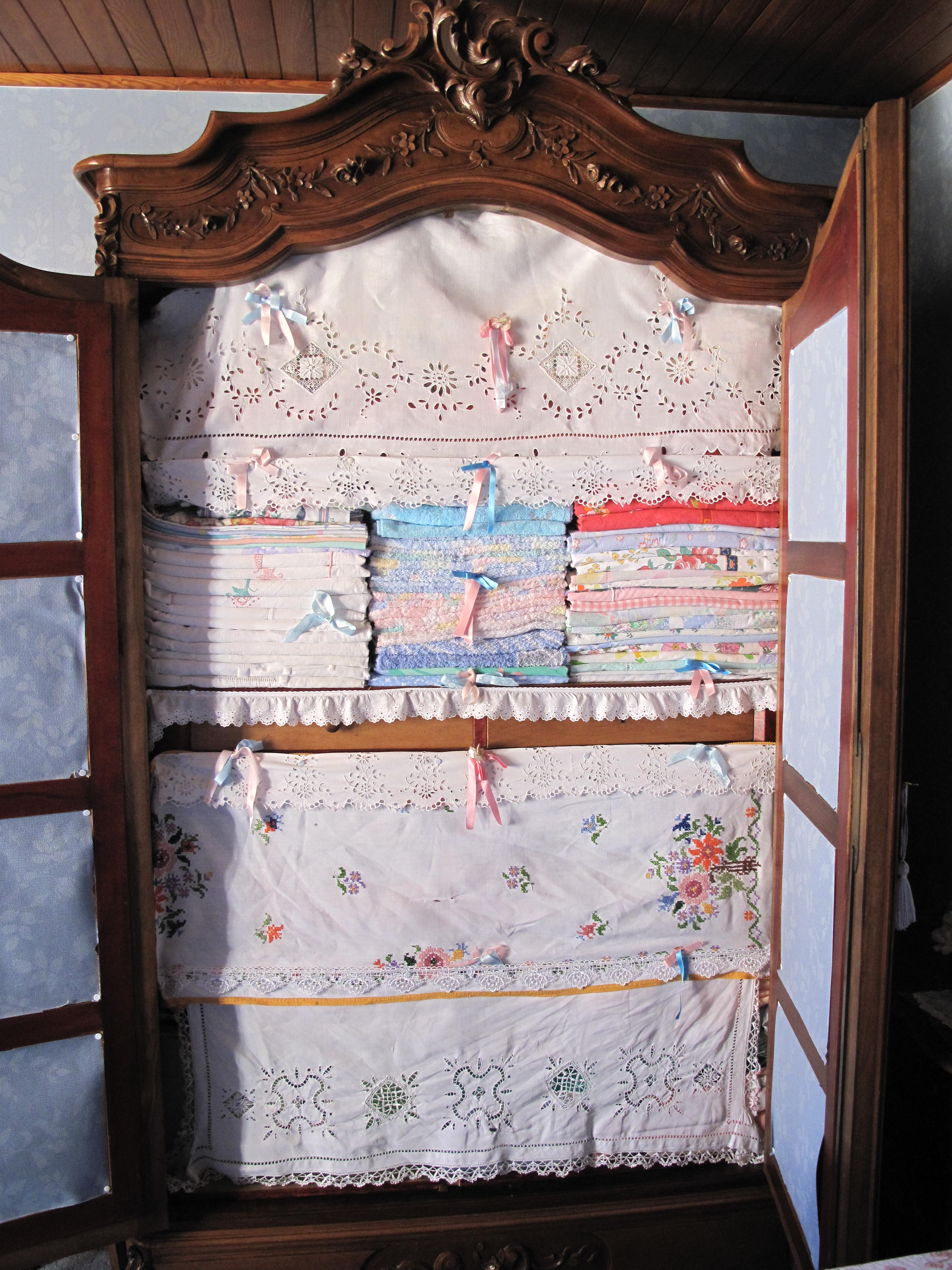
Linen-press from France

Traditionally, a linen-press (or just press) is a cabinet, usually of woods such as oak, walnut, or mahogany, and designed for storing or pressing sheets, table-napkins, clothing, and other textiles.

== History ==
Such linen-presses were made chiefly in the 17th, 18th, and 19th centuries and are now considered decorative examples of antique furniture. Early versions were often simple, with some exhibiting carving characteristic of Jacobean designs. Examples made during the 18th and 19th centuries often featured expensive veneers and intricate inlays and were designed to occupy prominent places in early bedrooms as storage closets for clothing. A linen press can also be a literal press, used to press linen flat.

In modern houses, a linen press is often a built-in cabinet near a bedroom or bathroom, for easy access to fresh bed sheets and towels. Analogous terms are laundry cupboard or linen cupboard.

In Ireland the term hot press describes an airing cupboard used for storing linen.

== See also ==
- Cupboard
- Closet
