= Service robot =

Robot that assists humans

Video: A type of service robot which became popular with the rise of the smart home technology is the robotic lawn mower, here applied in a small garden.

Service robots assist human beings, typically by performing a job that is dirty, dull, distant, dangerous or repetitive (four Ds of robotization). They typically are autonomous or operated by a built-in control system, with manual override options. The term "service robot" does not have a strict technical definition. The International Organization for Standardization defines a "service robot" as a robot "that performs useful tasks for humans or equipment excluding industrial automation applications".

Joseph F. Engelberger, known as the "father of the robot arm", developed the first industrial robot arm, "Unimate" using George Devel.

According to ISO 8373, robots require "a degree of autonomy", which is the "ability to perform intended tasks based on current state and sensing, without human intervention". For service robots, this ranges from partial autonomy – including human–robot interaction – to full autonomy – without active human–robot intervention. The International Federation of Robotics (IFR) statistics for service robots therefore include systems based on some degree of human–robot interaction or even full teleoperation as well as fully autonomous systems.

Service robots are categorized according to personal or professional use. They have many forms and structures as well as application areas.

== Types ==
The possible applications of robots to assist in human chores is widespread. At present there are a few main categories that these robots fall into.

=== Industrial ===
Industrial service robots can be used to carry out simple tasks, such as examining welding, as well as more complex, harsh-environment tasks, such as aiding in the dismantling of nuclear power stations. Industrial robots have been defined by the International Federation of Robotics as "an automatically controlled, reprogrammable, multipurpose manipulator programmable in three or more axes, which may be either fixed in place or mobile for use in industrial automation applications".

=== Frontline Service Robots ===
Service robots are system-based autonomous and adaptable interfaces that interact, communicate and deliver service to an organization's customers.

=== Domestic ===
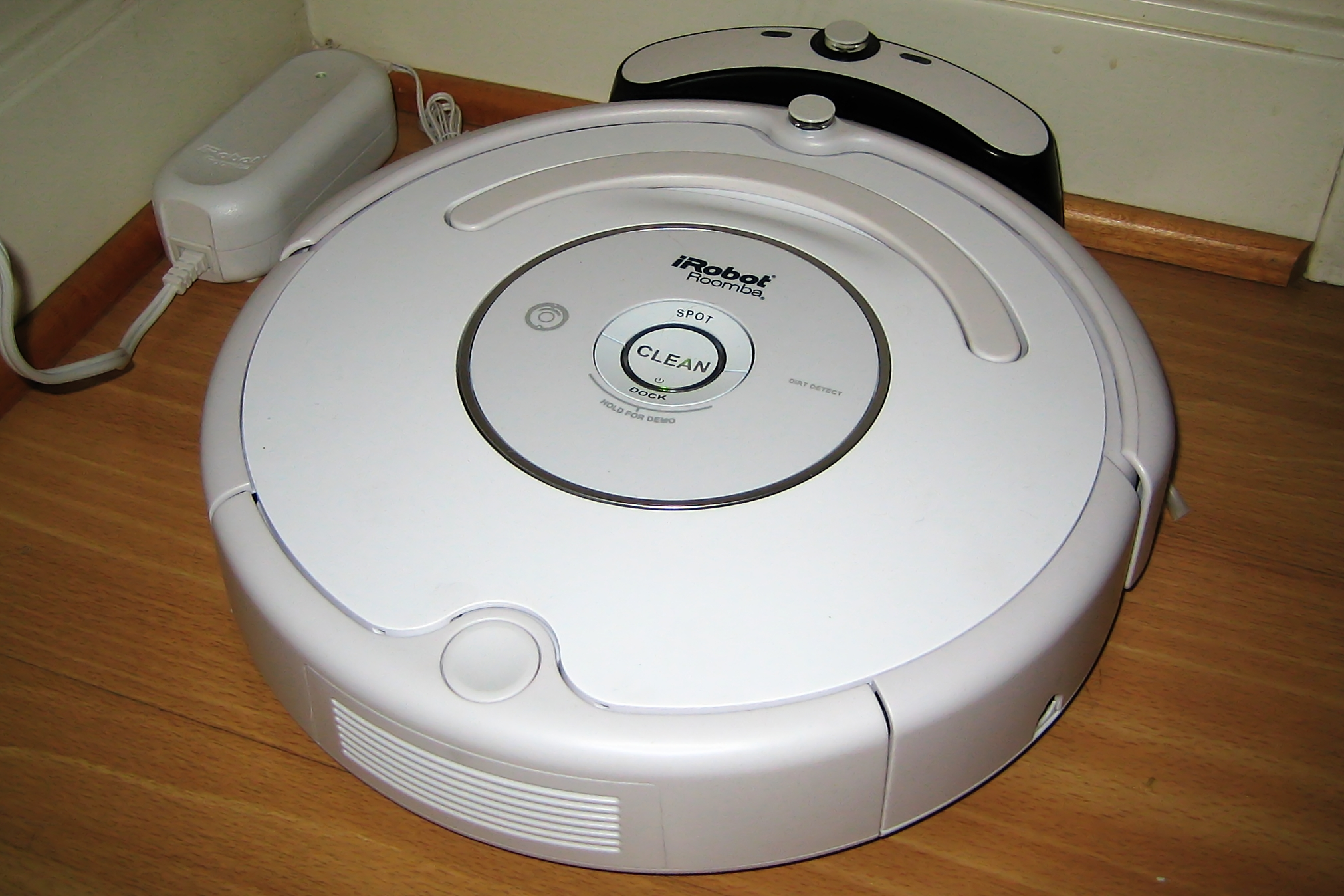
The Roomba vacuum cleaner is one of the most popular domestic service robots.

Domestic robots perform tasks that humans regularly perform in non-industrial environments, like people's homes such as for cleaning floors, mowing the lawn, pool maintenance, leaf blowing and snow blowing. People with disabilities, as well as people who are older, may soon be able to use service robots to help them live independently. It is also possible to use certain robots as assistants or butlers.

=== Scientific ===
Robotic systems perform many functions such as repetitive tasks performed in research. These range from the multiple repetitive tasks made by gene samplers and sequencers, to systems which can almost replace the scientist in designing and running experiments, analysing data and even forming hypotheses. The ADAM at the University of Aberystwyth in Wales can "[make] logical assumptions based on information programmed into it about yeast metabolism and the way proteins and genes work in other species. It then set about proving that its predictions were correct."

Autonomous scientific robots perform tasks which humans would find difficult or impossible, from the deep sea to outer space. The Woods Hole Sentry can descend to 4,500 metres and allows a higher payload as it does not need a support ship or the oxygen and other facilities demanded by human piloted vessels. Robots in space include the Mars rovers which could carry out sampling and photography in the harsh environment of the atmosphere on Mars.

=== Food delivery ===
Food delivery robots are a type of service robot. In addition to delivering ordered meals from a restaurant's kitchen to customers' tables, these robots can also collect leftover dishes and trays after the meal. Food delivery robots first emerged in China in the mid-2010s. During the COVID-19 pandemic in 2019, their use quickly spread across various regions to reduce human contact in customer service.

Although primarily used in restaurants, food delivery robots are also employed in other environments such as hospitals and hotels, where they are used to transport various items. Their main function is to deliver freshly prepared dishes from the kitchen to customers. After restaurant staff designate the delivery location, the robot navigates to the customer's seat to complete the delivery.

These robots are typically capable of autonomous movement. While some rely on magnetic tape on the floor to navigate, others utilize cameras or LiDAR sensors to map indoor routes and determine their position using SLAM (simultaneous localization and mapping). In factory settings, mobile robots generally follow pre-defined routes, where magnetic tape alone is sufficient. However, in restaurants, the frequent cleaning of floors may cause the tape to peel off, and foot traffic patterns tend to be less predictable. Therefore, robots equipped with SLAM technology often perform more efficiently in such environments.

Some delivery robots use cameras to determine their location. By placing special markers or stickers on the ceiling, the robots can use infrared sensors to identify their position through reflected signals. These robots may also be equipped with ultrasonic sensors to detect obstacles. In some cases, food delivery robots are integrated with tabletop tablets, allowing customers to place orders directly. Certain models are even equipped with basic emotional expression capabilities.

== Examples ==
- CoroBot
- Gita
- Rollin' Justin
- Roomba
- Sanbot (robot)

== Social and cultural impact ==
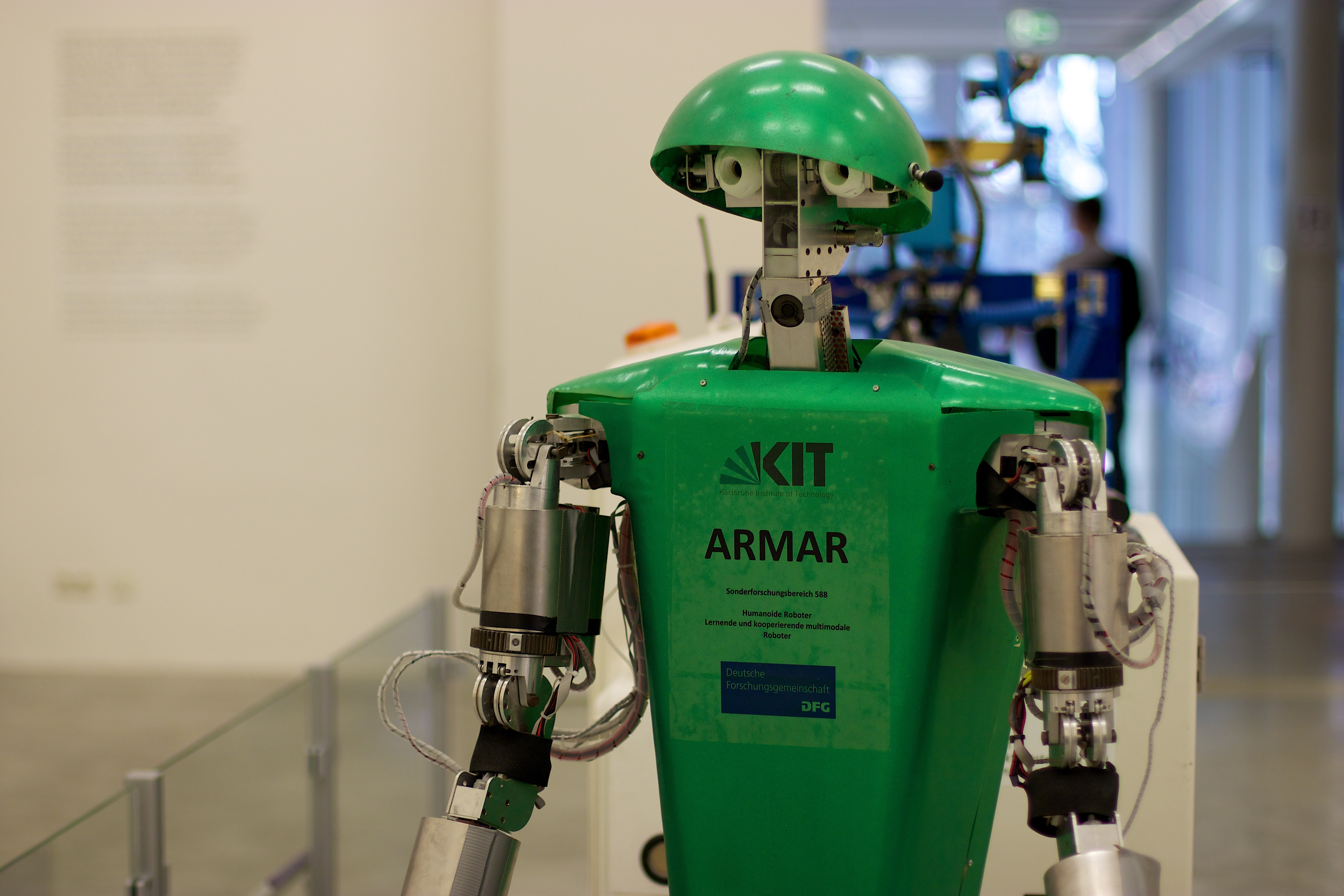
ARMAR II service robot at Karlsruhe Institute of Technology, Deutsche Museum, Munich

Service robots have raised concerns about their broader social and economic consequences, particularly regarding inequality and access. The deployment of service robots is largely concentrated in wealthy, industrialized nations, while developing countries have limited access to these technologies. According to Khor (2018), automation could result in job losses of 55 to 85 percent in developing economies, where workers have little influence over how these technologies are designed or distributed.

Research has also identified significant gender bias in the design of service robots. Many service robots and voice assistants are given female names, voices, and personalities associated with service and submission, a pattern that has been criticized for reinforcing existing gender stereotypes. Scholars have noted that designing robots with stereotypically feminine characteristics for low-status service roles risks amplifying social inequalities rather than challenging them.

Disability scholars have further argued that service robots, including those designed for healthcare, are often built around assumptions of an able-bodied norm, without meaningful input from disabled people themselves. This raises questions about whose needs are centered in the design process.

Cultural and religious differences also shape how service robots are received globally. Research on human–robot interaction has found that people's responses to robots are significantly influenced by cultural background, suggesting that culturally sensitive design remains an underdeveloped area in the field.

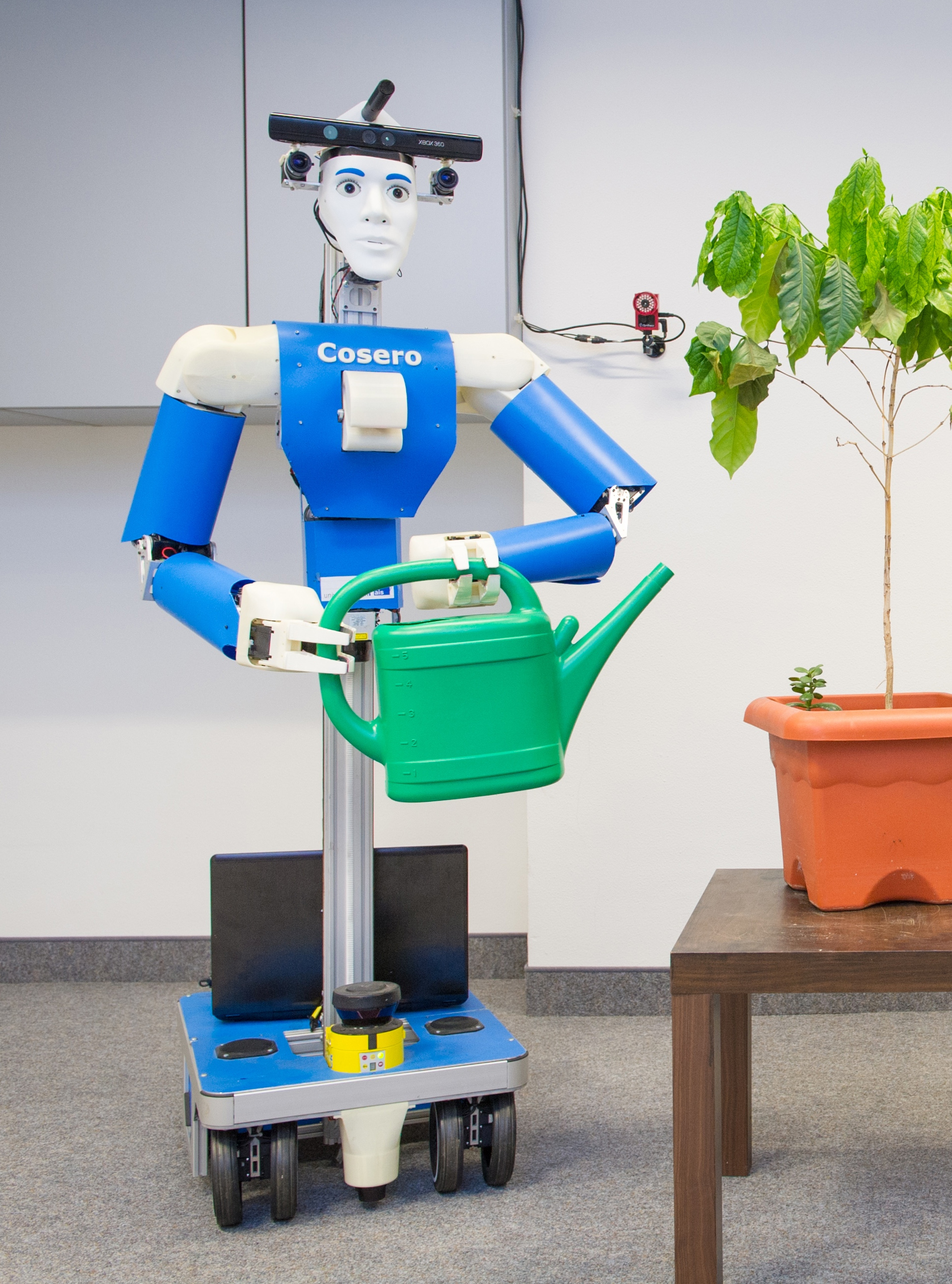
Cognitive Service Robot Cosero

== See also ==
- Domestic robot
- Home automation for the elderly and disabled
- Personal robot
- Robot kit
- Social robot
- Agricultural robot
