= Topo (robot) =

Robot

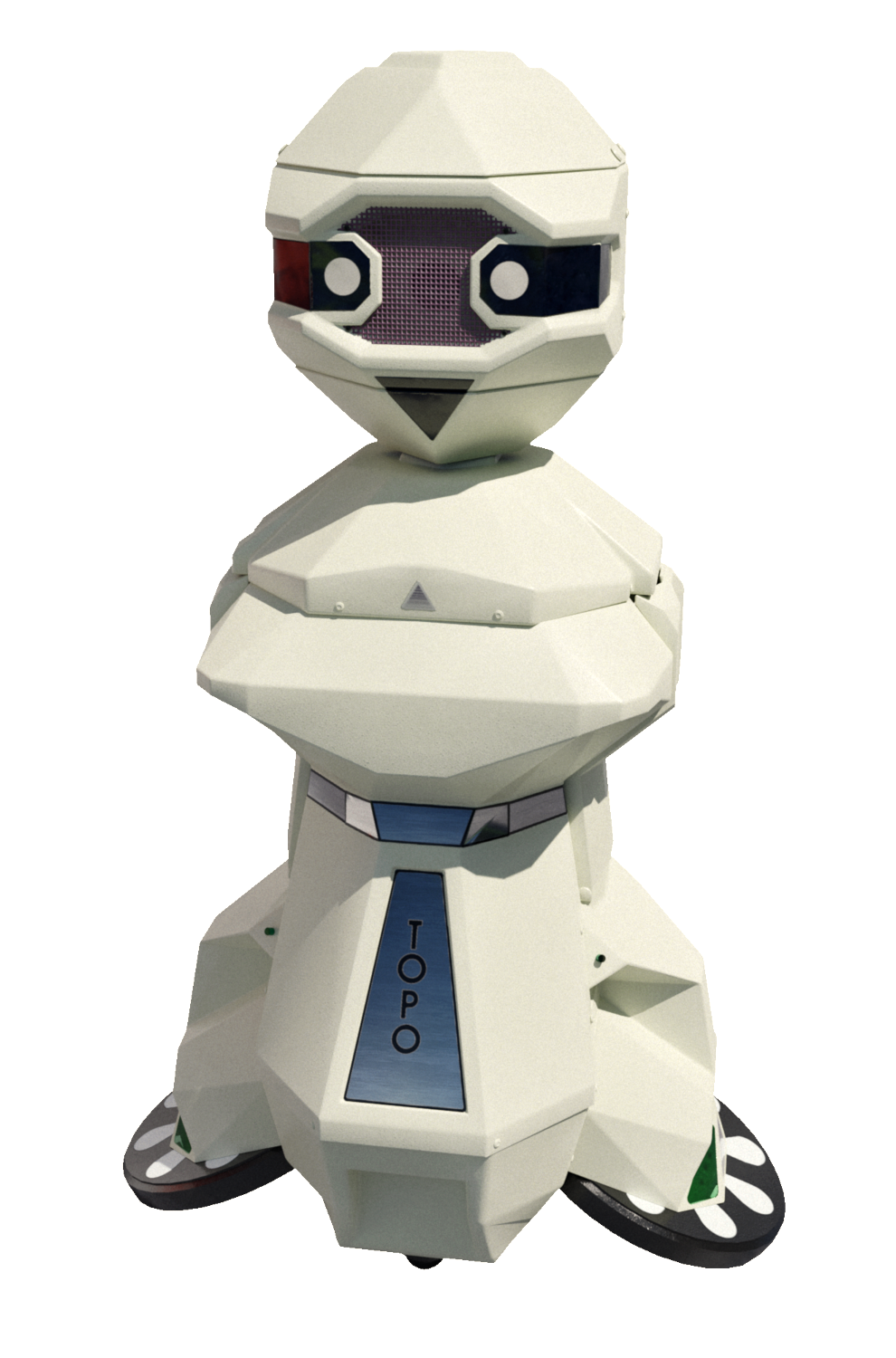
- Topo I
- Developer: William H.T. La
- Manufacturer: Androbot Inc.
- Type: robot
- Released: May 1983
- Introductory price: US$495 (equivalent to $1,563 in 2024)
- Discontinued: TOPO I - April 1984
- Units sold: 120
- Units shipped: 650
- Successor: TOPO II, TOPO III, BOB, BOB/XA, FRED, ANDROMAN

Topo is a series of robots designed in the 1980s by Androbot Inc., for the consumer and education markets. It is wirelessly programmable via an Apple II with a modified version of BASIC called TopoBASIC (and later Forth with TopoFORTH). The program allows the robot to perform a set of geometric movements, to move about a room and perform tasks. It is like a servant robot, although it does not truly meet the requirements of a robot, as it had no sensors to use to receive input and then make decisions accordingly. It also cannot communicate back with the Apple II any information, nor calibrate its own motors to ensure an accurate task is being performed

The robots were sold commercially starting in May 1983, and were intended to be inexpensive, lacking a complicated manipulating device. By 1984 Topo II (also known as Topo w/ Sound) would release, having updated software and the ability to use text-to-speech. Later in 1984 Topo III would begin production to a limited quantity. This last iteration removed the detachable arms, instead going for swappable trays, alongside consolidating the ABS plastic shell into just two pieces. A final Topo IV was planned during the final days of the company, but only its sensor belt was built before the company shut down. Topo IV's spec sheet was closer to Androbot's Brains On Board line of robots.

Units are beige molded plastic with two drive wheels as feet and stand 36½ inches tall. The series could be equipped with additional plastic accessories, such as the AndroWagon and AndroFridge, for carrying objects. Communication is via a radio or infrared transmitter attached to a personal computer. Topo II and III use an infrared transmitter, and can be controlled by a four way pad on the top of their head that also serves as the infrared receiver.

== See also ==
- HERO, a programmable robot series for home computers from 1982-1995
- 1980s in science and technology
