= Book folding =

Stage in book production

Book folding is the stage of the book production process in which the pages of the book are folded after printing and before binding.

The folding process is also necessary to produce print products other than books—for instance mailings, magazines, leaflets.

== History ==
Until the middle of the 19th century, book folding was done by hand, typically with a bone folder, and was a trade. In the 1880s and 1890s, book folding machines by Brown and Dexter came onto the market, and by the 1910s hand-folding was rare, with one publisher declaring them to be "practically obsolete" in 1914.

== Folding machines ==
Two main types of mechanisms are commonly employed in folding machines: buckle folders and knife folders.

=== Buckle folder ===
In a buckle folder, the paper is first passed through 2 spinning rollers, which feed the paper into a pair of guide plates that redirect the paper at a slight angle, bending the paper. At the far end of the guide plates is a "paper stop". As the rollers continue to spin, the paper continues to slide in between the guides until it hits the paper stop, then, having nowhere else to go, buckles at the interface between the rollers and the angled guides. As the rollers continue to spin, the buckle increases, until it is eventually caught by a pair of "nip" rollers, which pull the buckle in and compresses and flattens it into a neat crease.

Adjusting the paper stop in a buckle folder determines where the fold will be placed. Also, a buckle folder may contain only 3 rollers, with one shared by both the input rollers and the nip rollers.

Although buckle folders are fast, simple, efficient, and have small folding tolerances, they are not suitable for substrate of very low (<40g/m^{2}) or very heavy paper grammage (>120g/m^{2}). Buckle folder machines are more widespread, but are more commonly used for advertising matter than books.

=== Knife folder ===
In a knife folder, a sheet of paper is fed horizontally over 2 unpowered rollers until it hits a paper stop, at which point a dull blade pushes down on the paper and in between the 2 rollers to create the fold.

Although the knife folder is slower than buckle folders, it is more precise and can handle a wider variety of papers, including heavier papers. It also has small folding tolerances, but is a more complex machine. Knife folding machines are used in the modern book making process.

== Folding variants ==
1. Letter Fold / C-Fold / Tri-Fold; 2. Tri-Fold / Gate Fold; 3. Double Gate Fold / Roll Fold; 4. Z-Fold / Accordion (6-page); 5. Double Fold / Double Parallel Fold; 6. French Fold / Double Right-Angle Fold

=== Cross folds ===
A cross fold is when a paper is folded once, then rotated 90 degrees and folded again. The creases therefore cross each other at right angles. The most basic cross fold is the French fold, or right-angle fold. Other examples include the 16-page broadside and the 12-page letter.

=== Parallel folds ===
Folding a paper more than once in the same direction (i.e. with parallel creases) is called parallel folding. Common examples of this are the half fold, letter fold, gate fold, and Z-fold.

==== Concertina fold ====
A concertina fold, also known as a zig-zag fold, accordion fold or z-fold, is a continuous parallel folding of brochures and similar printed material in an accordion-like fashion, that is with folds alternatively made to the front and back in zig-zag folds. Because they do not nest (as in Letter Folds) panels can be the same size. Seen from above, concertina folds resemble a Z or M or series of zigs and zags.

A leporello binding has its pages concertina-folded, as above, but also has front and back boards so that it can be handled like a normal book. Sometimes there is a spine too, which provides a normal page-turning experience while eliminating the gutter of normal bookbinding. The origin of the word is based on the manservant in Mozart's Don Giovanni. At one point in the opera, Leporello unfolds a lengthy concertina list of his master's sexual conquests.

==== Letter fold ====
Folding pattern in which the folds are parallel and in the same direction, so that a kind of spiral is produced. The letter fold is a parallel fold. Two or more panels of the same width of the folded signature are folded around one panel. When the signature is folded twice, there are three panels on each side (six pages); with a tri-fold, the result is four panels on each side (eight pages). To allow proper nesting of panels that fold in, the inner panels are usually 0.8 mm to 3.2 mm smaller than the outer panels with the inner end panel being the smallest.

Also known as a spiral fold, trifold, brochure fold, business letter, C fold, roll fold and barrel fold.

==== Gate fold ====
Also known as a window fold.

==== Double parallel fold ====
In double parallel folds the paper is folded in half and then folded in half again with a fold parallel to the first fold. To allow for proper nesting the two inside folded panels are 0.8 mm to 3.2 mm smaller than the two outer panels.

==== Double gatefold ====
In double gatefolds there are three parallel folds. The left and right edges of the paper fold and meet in the middle, without overlapping, along a center fold. The outer panels (the ones that fold in to the middle) are usually 0.8 mm to 3.2 mm smaller than the inner panels (the ones covered by the panels that fold in) to allow for proper folding and nesting.

==== French fold ====
Takes a concertina fold, folded in half down the middle to create 8 individual sections. Also known as cross fold and quarter fold.

== See also ==
- Book
- Book publishing
- Paper size (influenced by the number of folds)
