= Google Home (platform) =

Software platform by Google for home automation

- Screenshot
- Developer: Google

Stable release(s) [±]
- Android: 4.24.28 / July 30, 2026; 3 months ago
- iOS (Note: Including iPadOS): 4.24.25 / August 5, 2026; 2 months ago
- Wear OS: 2.79.36.1 / October 1, 2025; 13 months ago
- Operating system: Android 9+ (Note: Including Wear OS); iOS 17+; ChromeOS; Android TV
- Type: Home automation
- Website: https://home.google.com/welcome/

Google Home is a smart home platform developed by Google that lets users configure, communicate with and control smart appliances using devices that run Google-made operating systems. Google Home communicates with devices using HomeKit, the software framework and communication protocol developed by Google, and the open Matter standard. By designing rooms, items, and actions in Google Home, users can enable automations in the home through a voice command to Gemini, through Google's Home app, or third party apps. With Google Home, developers are able to create complex applications in order to manage accessories at a high level.

Google Home primarily competes with smart home platforms from Amazon and Apple. As of 2024, Google lists over 10,000 devices compatible with Google Home, compared to 1,000 for Apple and 85,000 for Amazon.

== Overview ==
=== Creation ===
The platform was initially created to manage only Google's own smart speakers (one of which was also called Google Home) and Chromecasts, but gradually expanded in subsequent years. The Google Wifi app was rolled into the platform in July 2021, and support for the old Nest app is gradually being phased out.

=== Matter standard ===
On December 18, 2019, Google announced it would be working closely with Samsung, Amazon, and Apple to create an open standard for smart home automation called Matter. Matter aims to reduce fragmentation across different vendors, and achieve interoperability among smart home devices and Internet of things (IoT) platforms from different providers. The project was delayed to fall 2022 due to "unprecedented interest" by the Connectivity Standards Alliance (CSA). Version 1.0 of Matter was published on the October 4, 2022. Matter has been supported in Google Home since Android 8.1 and its forks.

== Home app ==
While the Home app was introduced in 2016, it initially did not offer support for many smart home functionalities. That came later in 2018, with support for devices that were developed for Google Assistant. More features have since been added, such as Automations in 2022, and Home APIs for developers in 2024.

=== Google TV and Google Nest speakers ===
Android TVs with the Google TV interface can control Google Home devices using a home panel. The panel can only show devices marked as "favorites". But voice commands can still be utilized to interact with non-favorite devices.

The Google Home speaker was the first smart speaker to support voice commands for Google Home via Google Assistant. These devices can unlock or open secure appliances such as locks, provided a PIN is supplied verbally.

==== Home hubs ====
Initially, hubs were not required for the use of Google Home, as it was primarily a cloud-to-cloud-based service, but since the adoption of Matter and Thread to the platform, which utilize local connections, they have become required for users that seek to utilize such standards. Google-made hubs that include both technologies are the Nest Hub (2nd gen), Nest Hub Max, Nest Wifi Pro, and the Google TV Streamer (4K).

== Device categories ==
"Works with Google Home" badge

Google Home currently supports the following device categories:

Device group	Device type	Matter	Cloud-to-cloud	Home APIs
Lighting	Light	Yes	Yes	Yes
Lighting	Outlet	Yes	Yes	Yes
Lighting	Switch	Yes	Yes	Yes
Climate	Thermostat	Yes	Yes	Yes
Climate	Air conditioner	No	Yes	Yes
Climate	Air cooler	No	Yes	Yes
Climate	Air freshner	No	Yes	No
Climate	Air purifier	Yes	Yes	Yes
Climate	Blinds	Yes	Yes	Yes
Climate	Curtain	No	Yes	No
Climate	Dehumidifier	No	Yes	No
Climate	Fan	Yes	Yes	Yes
Climate	Heater	No	Yes	Yes
Climate	Humidifier	No	Yes	No
Climate	Radiator	No	Yes	No
Climate	Window	No	Yes	Yes
Climate	Boiler	No	Yes	Yes
Bed & bath	Shower	No	Yes	Yes
Bed & bath	Bathtub	No	Yes	Yes
Bed & bath	Bed	No	Yes	No
Bed & bath	Blanket	No	Yes	No
Bed & bath	Closet	No	Yes	Yes
Bed & bath	Shutter	No	Yes	No
Outdoor	Sprinkler	No	Yes	Yes
Outdoor	Awning	No	Yes	No
Outdoor	Mower	No	Yes	Yes
Outdoor	Pergola	No	Yes	Yes
Safety & security	Camera	No	Yes	Yes
Safety & security	CO detector	No	Yes	No
Safety & security	Door	No	Yes	Yes
Safety & security	Doorbell	No	Yes	Yes
Safety & security	Garage door	No	Yes	Yes
Safety & security	Gate	No	Yes	Yes
Safety & security	Lock	Yes	Yes	Yes
Safety & security	Smoke detector	No	Yes	No
Safety & security	Security system	No	Yes	Yes
Safety & security	Sensor	Yes	Yes	Yes

== See also ==
- Google Nest
- Google TV Streamer
- IFTTT
- Matter (standard)
