= List of hexapod robots =

This is a list of hexapod robots.

Image	Name	Year	Created by	Country	Dimensions	Weight	DOF	Speed	Description	Links
	Hexbug		Innovation First, Inc.	United States					Insectoid toy robot.	Official site
	LAURON I LAURON II; LAURON III; LAURON IV	1994 (LAURON I); 1995 (LAURON II); 1999 (LAURON III); 2004 (LAURON IV)	FZI	Germany		11 kg 16 kg 18 kg 27 kg			LAURON IVc is able to carry a payload of up to 15 kg.	Official site
	Rhex	1998	U of M, McGill University; CME, UC, PU, CU	United States; Canada			6	2.7 m/s		Official site
	Stiquito	1992	IU	United States					Inexpensive insectoid robot.	Official site
	Whegs I Whegs II; Autonomous Whegs II		CWRU	United States	20 inches long ? ?			5.5 km/h km/h km/h		Official site
	Adaptive Suspension Vehicle (ASV)	1986	OSU	United States	5.2 meters long 2.4 meters wide	2700 kg		2.25 m/s	Large walking vehicle with human rider.	IEEE Paper
