= Adaptable robotics =

Adaptable Robotics refers to a field of robotics with a focus on creating robotic systems capable of adjusting their hardware and software components to perform a wide range of tasks while adapting to varying environments. The 1960s introduced robotics into the industrial field. Since then, the need to make robots with new forms of actuation, adaptability, sensing and perception, and even the ability to learn stemmed the field of adaptable robotics. Significant developments such as the PUMA robot, manipulation research, soft robotics, swarm robotics, AI, cobots, bio-inspired approaches, and more ongoing research have advanced the adaptable robotics field tremendously. Adaptable robots are usually associated with their development kit, typically used to create autonomous mobile robots. In some cases, an adaptable kit will still be functional even when certain components break.

Adaptable robotics systems successfully adapt to their environment using techniques such as modular design, machine learning, and sensor feedback. Using this, they have revolutionized various industries and can address many real-world challenges in the medical, industrial, extraterrestrial, and experimental fields. There are still many challenges to overcome in adaptable robotics, which presents opportunities for growth in the field.

== Fundamental concepts ==
An adaptable robot typically has attributes that distinguish it from robots that perform their task regardless of external factors. Four concepts that adaptable robots utilize to make this distinction are adaptability, sensing and perception, learning and intelligence, and actuation.

=== Adaptability ===
A robot can be defined as adaptive when it has capabilities such as intrinsic safety and performance without compromise, the ability to learn, and the capacity to perform tasks traditional robots are not capable of. These capabilities can be achieved through force control technology, hierarchical intelligence, and other innovative approaches. John Adler’s invention in 1994, the cyberknife, is a robotic surgery system that is capable of using ultra-fine precision in medical procedures which demonstrates such adaptations.

=== Sensing and Perception ===
Environmental information gathered through peripherals is processed intelligently in adaptable systems. AI systems can process this data and adjust task primitives accordingly, leading to adapted action. In 2001, the Canadarm 2 was launched to the ISS and played a key role in the maintenance of the station, using data from peripherals to adapt the ISS to environmental changes within it.

=== Learning and Intelligence ===
AI, Machine Learning, and Deep Learning allow systems to learn about the world around them and become progressively more intelligent when executing their tasks.[12] In 1997 the robot Sojourner was launched to Mars, with an onboard computer allowing it to adapt to unplanned events and obstacles even with minimal data; a precursor to the addition of AI in adaptable systems. Later that year, IBM’s Deep Blue computer defeated Garry Kasparov in a game of chess, a landmark for robotic AI’s ability to plan and react.

=== Actuation ===
Actuation in robotic systems allows the robot to move. Adaptable actuators typically function in response to environmental changes, such as changes in temperature which may change the shape of the actuator. Thus, altering functionality. Self-powering (untethered) actuation is achievable, especially in soft robotics where external stimuli can change the shape of an actuator, creating mechanical energy. In 1989 Rodney Brooks created Ghengis, a hexapedal robot capable of traversing difficult terrain. The Hexapedal model uses six actuators for mobility and has remained prominent with modern hexapedal models like the Rhex.

== Software ==
The kits come with an open software platform tailored to a range of common robotic functions. The kits also come with common robotics hardware that connects easily with the software (infrared sensors, motors, microphone and video camera), which add to the capabilities of the robot.

The process of modifying a robot to achieve varying capabilities such as collaboration could merely include the selection of a module, the exchange of modules, robotic instruction via software, and execution.

== Types ==
=== Soft Robots ===
Robotics with soft grippers is an emerging field in the adaptable robotic scene which is based on the Venus flytrap. Two soft robotic surfaces provide enveloping and pinching grasp modules. This technology is tested in a variety of environments to determine the effects of diverse objects, errors of object position, and soft robotic surface installation on grasping capacity. Untethered actuation is achievable, especially in soft robots with liquid crystal polymers, a category of stimuli-responsive materials with two way shape memory effect. This can allow the liquid crystal polymers to generate mechanical energy by changing shape in response to external stimuli, hence untethered actuation.

=== Modular Robots ===
Robots designed for the outdoors that adapt to changing landscapes and obstacles. These are constructed like a chain of individual modules with simple hinge joints, enabling modular robots to morph themselves into various shapes to traverse terrain. Some of these forms include configurations like spider, serpentine, and loop.

=== Swarm Robotics ===
Field of robotics utilizing swarm intelligence to groups of simple homogeneous robots. Swarm robots follow algorithms, usually designed to mimic the behavior of real animals, in order to determine their movements in response to environmental stimuli.

=== Biohybrid Robots ===
Biohybrid robotics use living tissues or cells to provide machines with functions that would be difficult to achieve otherwise. For instance, muscle cells have been utilized to allow certain biohybrid robots to move. Swarm robotics combine with biohybrid in certain cases, especially within the medical field Insect-machine hybrid robots, also known as cyborg insects or insect biobots, is the fusion of a living insect and artificial control system integrated with its body to drive its locomotion or behaviours.

== Applications ==
Adaptable robotics possess capabilities that have made them applicable to many fields including, but not limited to, the medical, industrial, and experimental fields.

Learning from demonstration is a strategy for transferring human motion skills to robots. The primary goal is to identify significant movement primitives, significant movements humans make, from demonstration and remake these motions to adapt the robot to that motion. There have been a few issues with robots being unable to adapt skills learned by learning from demonstration to new environments (a change from the scenario in which the robot was given initial demonstrations). These issues with learning from demonstration have been addressed with a learning model based on a nonlinear dynamic system which encodes trajectories as dynamic motion primitive, which are similar to movement primitives, but they are significant movements represented by a mathematical equation; equation variables change with the changing environment, altering the motion performed. The trajectories recorded through these systems have proven to apply to a wide variety of environments making the robots more effective in their respective spheres. Learning from demonstration has progressed the applicability of robotics in fields where precision is essential, such as surgical environments.

In the medical field, SAR technology focuses on taking sensory data from wearable peripherals to perceive the user’s state of being. The information gathered enables the machine to provide personalized monitoring, motivation, and coaching for rehabilitation. Intuitive Physical HRI and interfaces between humans and robots allow functionalities like recording the motions of a surgeon to infer their intent, determining the mechanical parameters of human tissue, and other sensory data to use in medical scenarios. Biohybrid robotics have medical applications utilizing biodegradable components to allow robots to function safely within the human body.

AI, machine learning, and deep learning have allowed advances in adaptable robotics such as autonomous navigation, object recognition and manipulation, natural language processing, and predictive maintenance. These technologies have been essential in the development of cobots (collaborative robots), which are robots capable of working alongside humans capable of adapting to changing environments.

In the industrial field, AI, Machine Learning, and Deep Learning can be used to perform quality control checks on manufactured products, identify defects in products, and alert production teams to make necessary changes in real-time.

== Challenges and limitations ==
Systems that involve physical collaboration between humans and robots are difficult to design well due to human uncertainty. Humans alter the force of their motions regularly due to human factors like emotion, biological processes, and other extraneous factors unknown to a robot. This can make sensory data difficult to quantify for successful adaptation in robots. Furthermore, the specific needs, characteristics, and preferences that a patient in a medical scenario may need vary from person to person. Adaptable robotic systems need extended time to adapt to the new environment introduced from patient to patient.

The need for reliable data from sensory technology is a challenge for adaptable systems, especially in the AI realm. With AI models becoming rapidly more advanced, the need to develop peripheral technologies able to provide necessary information for these systems becomes increasingly more challenging. Furthermore, the need for dynamic environments to train AI algorithms proves to be challenging as not every scenario a machine may find itself in will be introduced to it during training.

Swarm robots are limited by interference and collisions, uncertainty, lack of specialization, and lack of understanding of the behavioral pattern of the swarm. Biohybrid robotics have challenges with living cells being delicate even though they are adaptable to a variety of environments due to the properties of the biological material.

== See also ==
- Domestic robot
- Terrainability
