= Robot kit =

Construction kit for building robots

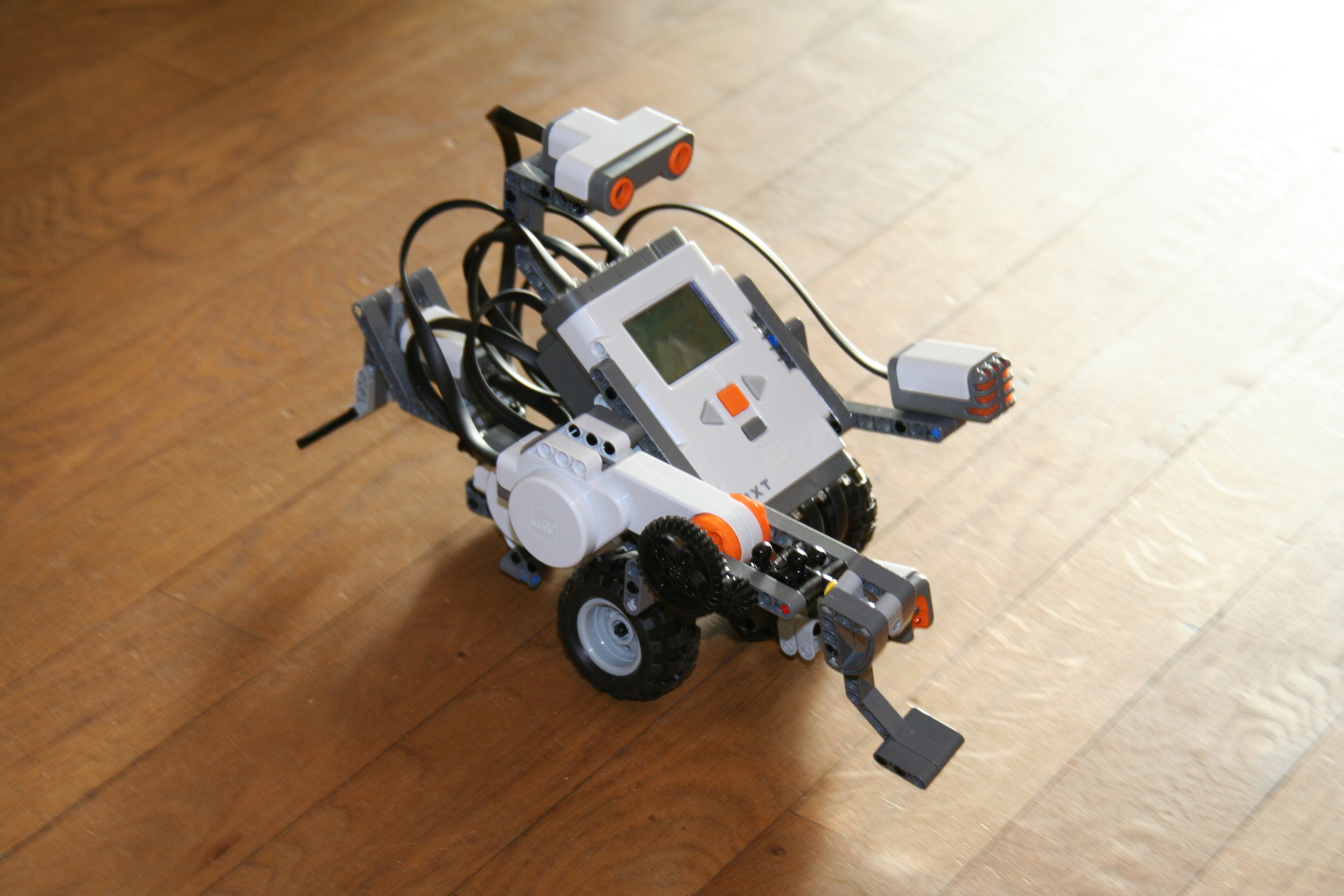
A robot built using the Lego Mindstorms NXT set

A robot kit is a special construction kit for building robots, especially autonomous mobile robots.

Toy robot kits are also supplied by several companies. They are mostly made of plastics elements such as Lego Mindstorms and the Robotis Bioloid, or of aluminium elements such as the Qfix kit.

The kits can consist of: structural elements, mechanical elements, motors (or other actuators), sensors and a controller board to control the inputs and outputs of the robot. In some cases, the kits can be available without electronics as well, to provide the user the opportunity to use their own.

== Robot kits ==
- Arduino controlling Tamiya (or another) kit
- Cubelets
- Lego Mindstorms
- Lynxmotion
- Qfix robot kit
- Robotis Bioloid
- Stiquito
- Tetrix Robotics Kit
- WonderBorg

== See also ==
- .dwg
- Adaptable robotics
- Domestic robot
- Open Design Alliance
- Open hardware
- Phidget
- Rapid prototyping
- Robotics suite
