= Hexapod (robotics) =

Type of robot

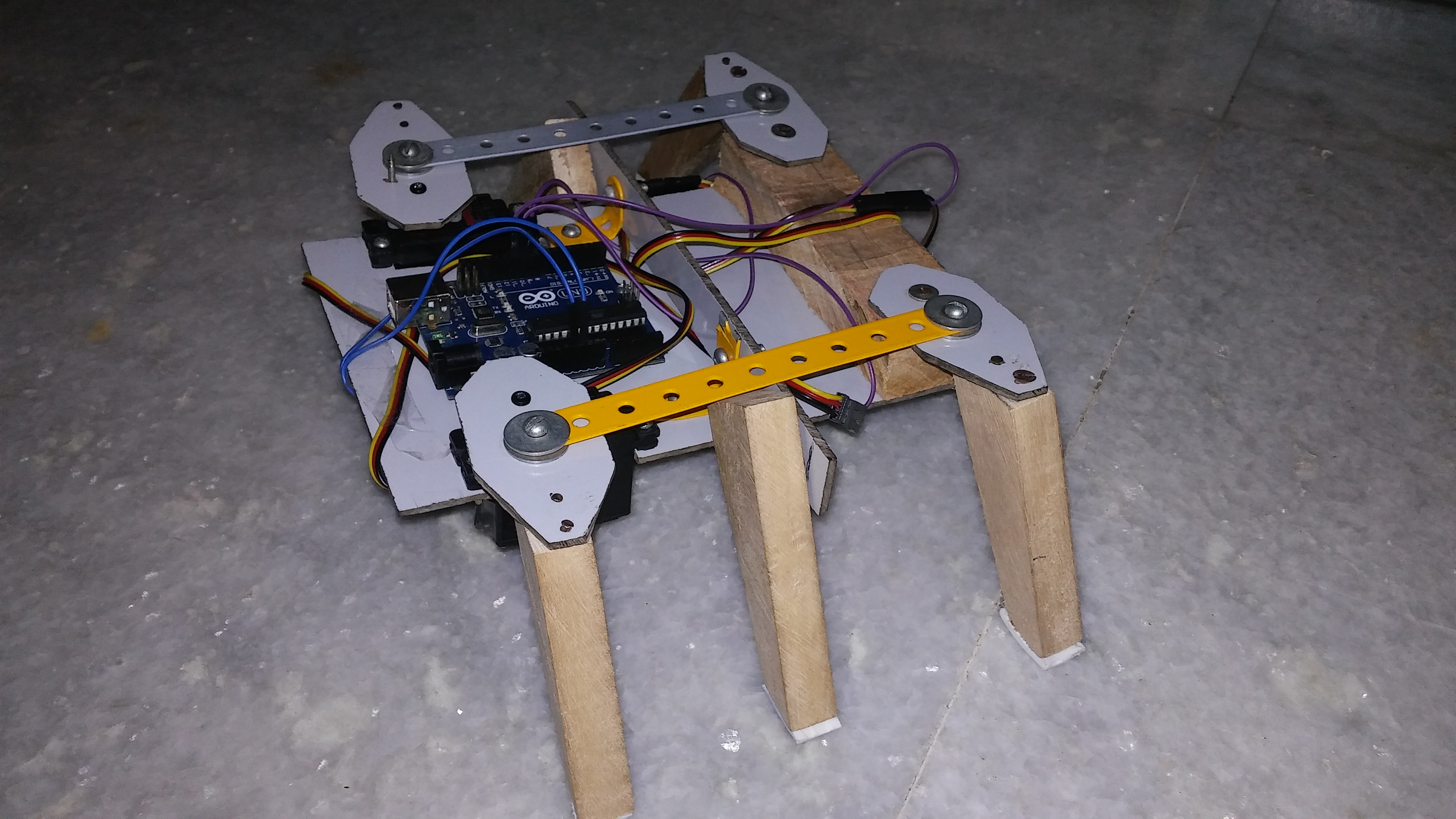
Beetle hexapod

A hexapod robot is a mechanical vehicle that walks on six legs. Since a robot can be statically stable on three or more legs, a hexapod robot has a great deal of flexibility in how it can move. If legs become disabled, the robot may still be able to walk. Furthermore, not all of the robot's legs are needed for stability; other legs are free to reach new foot placements or manipulate a payload.

Many hexapod robots are biologically inspired by Hexapoda locomotion – the insectoid robots. Hexapods may be used to test biological theories about insect locomotion, motor control, and neurobiology.

== Designs ==
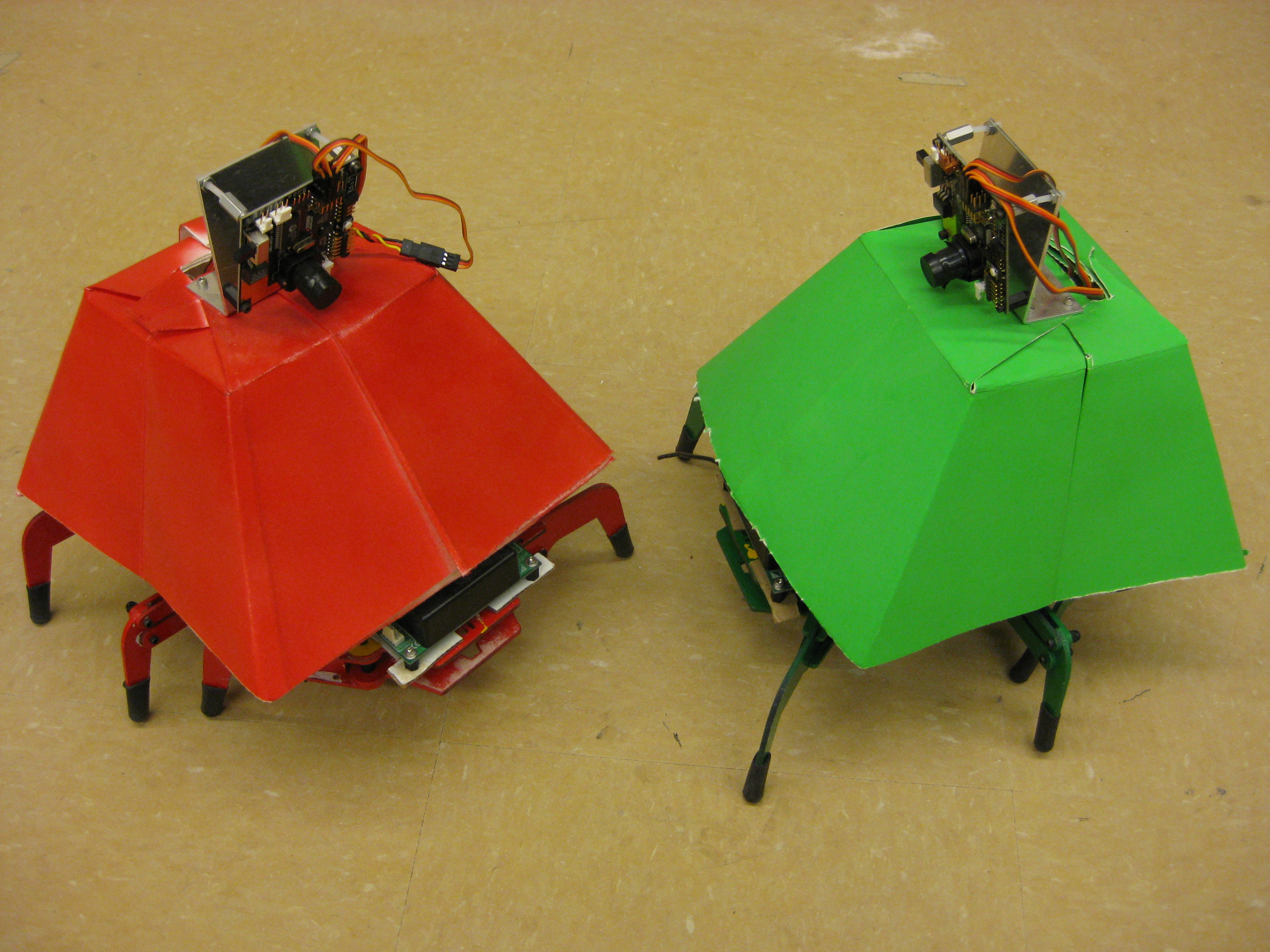
Two hexapod robots at the Georgia Institute of Technology with CMUCams mounted on top

Hexapod designs vary in leg arrangement. Insect-inspired robots are typically laterally symmetric, such as the RiSE robot at Carnegie Mellon. A radially symmetric hexapod is ATHLETE (All-Terrain Hex-Legged Extra-Terrestrial Explorer) robot at JPL.

Typically, individual legs range from two to six degrees of freedom. Hexapod feet are typically pointed, but can also be tipped with adhesive material to help climb walls or wheels so the robot can drive quickly when the ground is flat.

== Locomotion ==
Walking hexapod simulated in Webots

Most often, hexapods are controlled by gaits, which allow the robot to move forward, turn, and perhaps side-step. Some of the most common gaits are as follows:

- Alternating tripod: 3 legs on the ground at a time.
- Quadruped.
- Crawl: move just one leg at a time.

Gaits for hexapods are often stable, even in slightly rocky and uneven terrain.

Motion may also be nongaited, which means the sequence of leg motions is not fixed, but rather chosen by the computer in response to the sensed environment. This may be most helpful in very rocky terrain, but existing techniques for motion planning are computationally expensive.

== Biologically inspired ==
Insects are chosen as models because their nervous system are simpler than other animal species. Also, complex behaviours can be attributed to just a few neurons and the pathway between sensory input and motor output is relatively shorter. Insects' walking behaviour and neural architecture are used to improve robot locomotion. Conversely, biologists can use hexapod robots for testing different hypotheses.

Biologically inspired hexapod robots largely depend on the insect species used as a model. The cockroach and the stick insect are the two most commonly used insect species; both have been ethologically and neurophysiologically extensively studied. At present no complete nervous system is known, therefore, models usually combine different insect models, including those of other insects.

Insect gaits are usually obtained by two approaches: the centralized and the decentralized control architectures. Centralized controllers directly specify transitions of all legs, whereas in decentralized architectures, six nodes (legs) are connected in a parallel network; gaits arise by the interaction between neighbouring legs.

== List of robots ==
- Hexbug (insectoid toy robot)
- Stiquito (inexpensive insectoid robot)
- Rhex
- Whegs
- LAURON

== See also ==
- Biomechanics
- Insects
- Mondo spider
- Robotics
- Robot locomotion
- Stewart platform
