= WonderBorg =

Educational robot kit

Cover art for the international Tiger release.

The WonderBorg (Japanese: ワンダーボーグ, Hepburn: WandāBōgu) is a programmable consumer robot kit manufactured by Bandai for the WonderSwan and Microsoft Windows PCs in 2000. It is intended to match both the external appearance and mode of transport of a beetle, with functioning antennae and a six-legged design.

== History ==
The prototype for what would eventually become the WonderBorg was produced in cooperation between the Japan Science and Technology Agency and toy manufacturer Bandai. Initially, the WonderBorg was available only as an accessory for the WonderSwan, with a version for Windows PCs released later. Outside Asia, the PC-compatible WonderBorg was licensed and marketed by Tiger Electronics from 2001.

The WonderBorg was designed with education in mind, with a view to use in classrooms. To this end, an associated game, dubbed simply "JST Robot Game", was developed, in which students are required to clear an obstacle course by programming the robot to navigate a given maze correctly.

== Hardware ==
The WonderBorg was available in two retail configurations, with compatible tools for WonderSwan and PC, respectively. The WonderSwan version included a special cartridge with the software necessary to program the WonderBorg and an embedded infra-red transmitter, while the PC version shipped with a software CD for Windows and an infra-red transmitter to connect to a PC via serial port.

The WonderBorg itself requires assembly, and can be customised somewhat, with possible configurations involving differently sized gears favouring torque or speed, and wheels to replace the robot's usual six-legged design. Decal stickers were also included, to allow superficial decoration. Once assembled, the WonderBorg is powered by three AAA batteries and reacts to its environment using seven sensors:

- infrared receiver
- antennae: independent left and right tactile sensors
- eyes: independent left and right infrared LEDs
- light sensor
- floor sensor: detects the presence or absence of ground ahead
- internal clock sensor
- steps sensor

Using its two independent motors (left and right), the WonderBorg is able to move forward, reverse, turn while moving forward or backward, and rotate in place. Its main processor is an Elan EM78P451AQ (RISC-like 8-bit microprocessor).

== Software ==
Both the WonderSwan and PC versions are bundled with specialized WonderBorg programming software known as Robot Works. Rather than requiring the user to learn a complex programming language, the WonderBorg program is written using a graphical user interface, in which instructions for the robot are laid out in a grid. On one side of the grid the WonderBorg's various sensors can be laid out, with those higher on the grid taking priority. The robot is then given instructions on how to react to each trigger. The WonderSwan version additionally included a "pet" program, in which the WonderBorg would behave similarly to Bandai's prior Tamagotchi, a mode omitted from the PC version.

== See also ==
- AIBO, a series of robotic dogs manufactured by Sony
- Furby, a previous Tiger Electronics robot toy
- LAURON, a more recent six-legged insectoid robot
- Poo-Chi, a Tiger robot dog toy
