= Bristlebot =

Simple form of walking robot

A bristlebot or brushbot is an extremely simple form of walking robot. It is one of the simplest of all mobile robots, both in its function and its construction. As a result of this ease of construction, they have become popular projects at the school science fair level.

== Operation ==
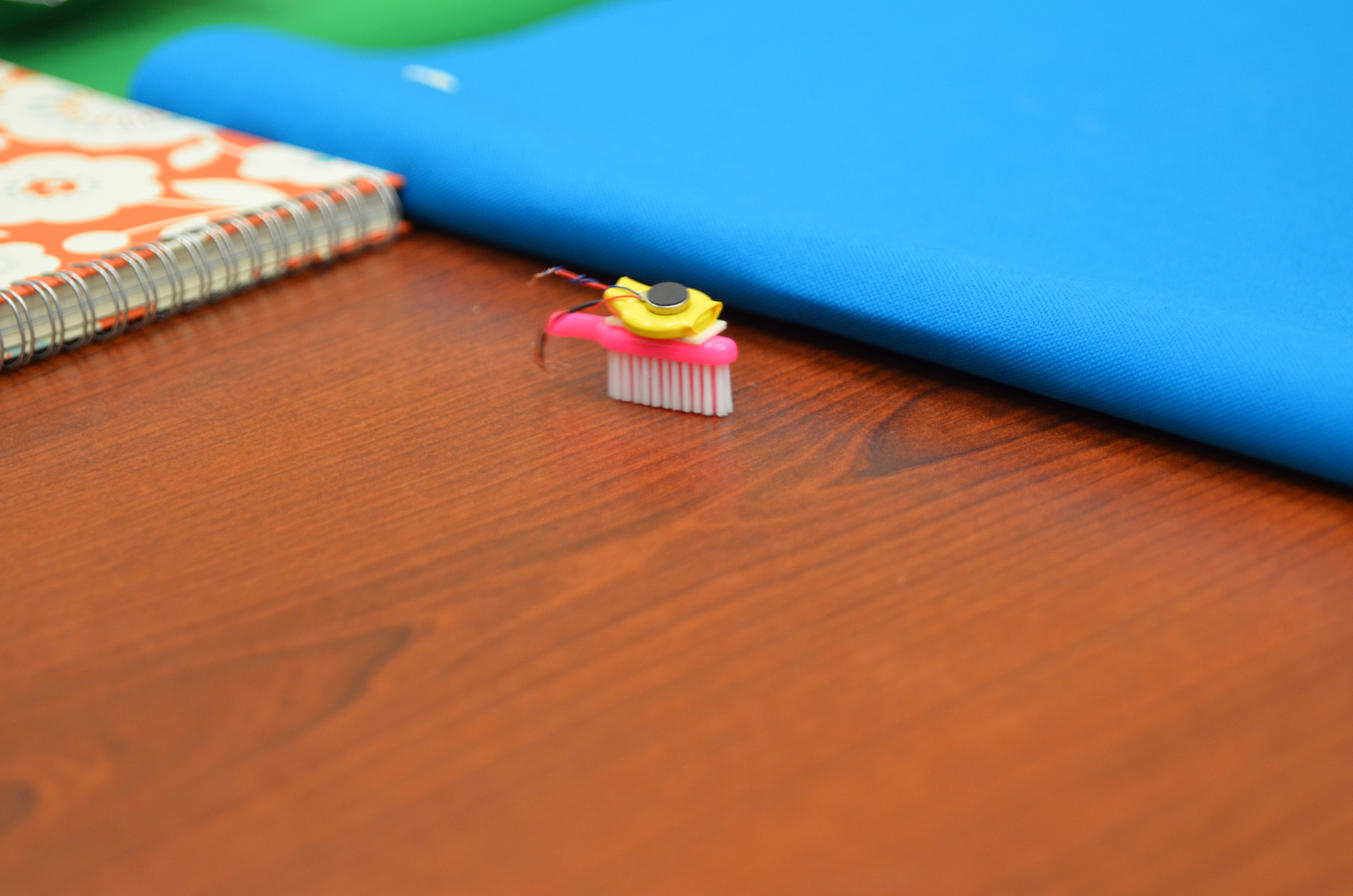
A DIY Bristlebot

A bristlebot is a simple, rigid-bodied robot where the lower surface is coated in bristles, like a brush or velvet. The mass of bristles are oriented so that there is an overall inclination to them away from vertical. This is broadly consistent across the robot body, so that it gives a preferred "forward" direction. The robot is driven by vibrating its body. The action of these vibrations through the mass of bristles is to gradually move the robot, in the preferential direction of the bristles. There is some comparison between the vibration of a bristlebot and the lashing of bacterial flagella.

Most bristlebots are electrically driven, making use of modern developments in low-mass motors and batteries. As bristlebots have such crude locomotion, for both efficiency and control, they are not usually considered as appropriate for sophisticated control systems or responsive behaviours.

=== Vibrobots ===
A vibrobot is a related robot, but based on the use of springy wire legs, rather than brush bristles.

Vibrobots powered by clockwork or elastic motors have a long history, pre-dating the electric bristlebots. They have been a regular theme in the work of Brazilian designer Chico Bicalho.

== Construction ==
Construction of bristlebots became popular in the mid 2000s, as cellphone vibrate motors became available as a low-cost item, either from scrap pagers and cellphones, or directly from their Chinese factories. These form an ideal bristlebot power source as they are both powerful enough and also light enough, even with a battery. The typical home-constructed bristlebot consists of only three functional parts: a toothbrush head, a vibrate motor and a lithium coin cell. Glue, tape or tie-wraps are used to assemble the parts.

The toothbrush must be selected and possibly trimmed to give a flat contact surface with most bristles aligned in one direction. Worn toothbrushes are often no use, as their splayed bristles point in every direction. Such a bristlebot may then rotate or oscillate, but without travelling. Some new brushes may have very vertical bristles that do not generate much movement, unless trimmed into a slope.

=== Group construction ===
Group construction of bristlebots is a popular science project for children, through schools, Maker Faires and similar.

Kits are available to 'simplify' assembly and add decoration, although this is very far from necessary.

=== Developments ===
Artbots or drawbots may be constructed by adding pens to a bristlebot, or using a few suitable pens as the bristles themselves. Such robots are used on a large sheet of paper, where they leave behind a drawn trail. This trail indicates the efficiency of the bristlebot, its distance travelled from the start relative to the circuitous distance along its crooked path.

Recent toothbrush heads, such as the Oral-B Pulsar, include rubber blades as well as stiff bristles. These make an even better performing bristlebot that is faster in a straight line.

Domestic scrubbing brushes, with larger motors, may be used to make larger brushbots with equally simple construction.

By separating the drive across two brush heads, a bristlebot may begin to have steering control. Simple robotics with long-established circuitry may then be used to drive each side independently, with two motors. By controlling their relative power with regard to an external stimulus such as light, a robot with simple behaviours such as light-seeking or light avoidance, may be constructed. This idea of creating a controllable, steerable BristleBot can be further extended by using a WiFi enabled micro controller to create a bristlebot that you can drive from a smartphone, or even teach to drive autonomously.

In BEAM robotics, a sophisticated bristlebot may begin to resemble a Walker, although these multi-legged robots are usually much more sophisticated, using multiple actuators with independent control.

== Commercial bristlebots ==
The popular Hexbug range of toy robots began with the Hexbug Nano, a bristlebot. Nano V2, a development of the original Nano released in 2013, has three additional flexible spines on their top surface. This gives them the new ability to climb vertically between two suitably spaced plates or tube walls. As the upper spines are only a narrow row, the 'bots are unstable when upside down and so become self-righting.

A variety of clear plastic tube habitats are offered with them. These range from a simple vertical tube to demonstrate climbing, through to multi 'bot habitats with multiple horizontal arenas linked by curved climbing tubes in clear plastic. A variety of additional construction set tube parts are available, including twisted tubes and funnels

The game Electric Football uses players with bristled bases to move across a vibrating playing field.
