= Tetrix Robotics Kit =

Robotics kit for educational and competition use

TETRIX Robotics
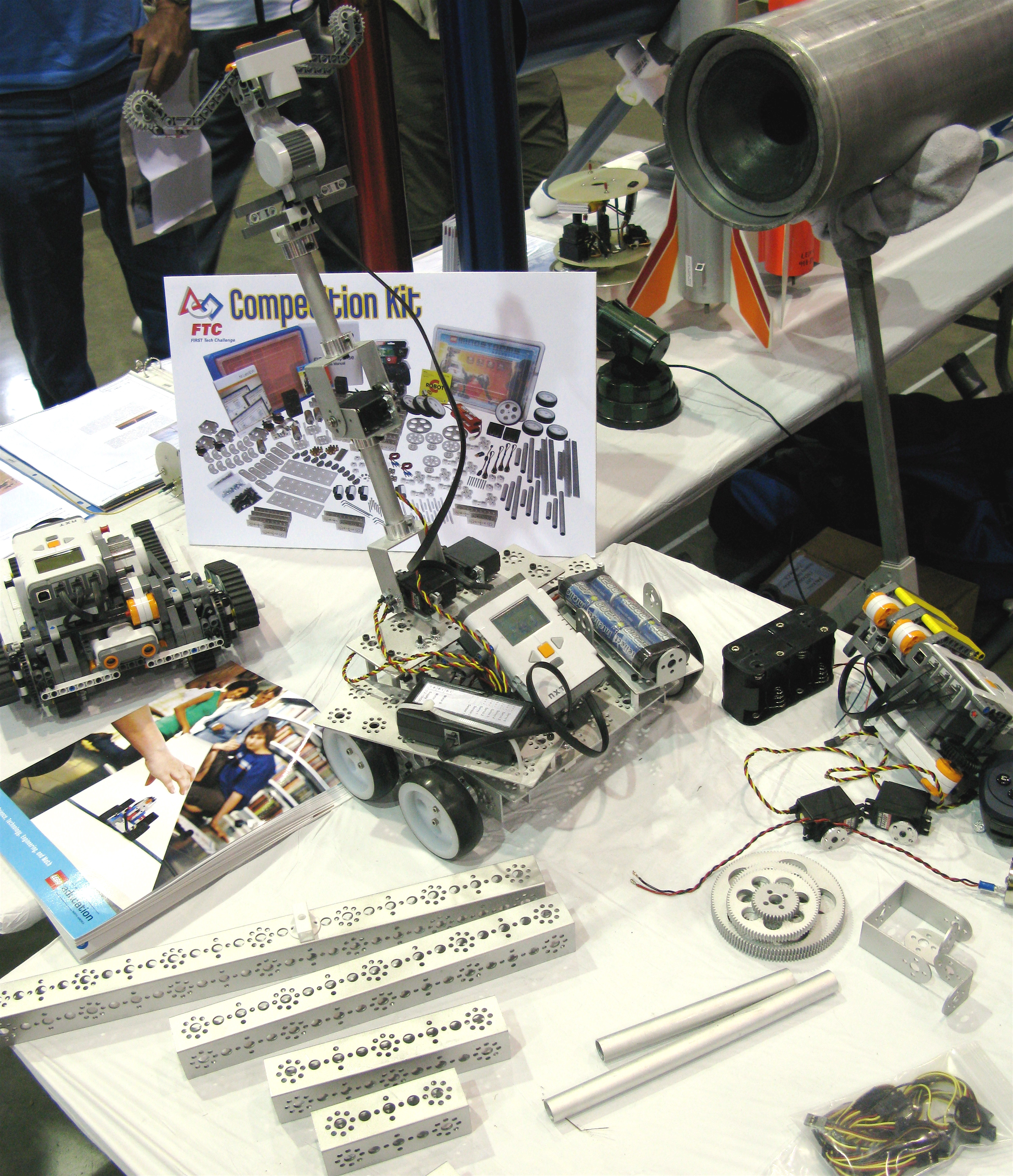
- TETRIX kit for FIRST Tech Challenge
- Other names: TETRIX
- Parent theme: Lego Mindstorms
- Availability: 1997–Present (joined to Mindstorms in 1998)
- Total sets: 2
- Official website

TETRIX Robotics consists of two robotic kits by Pitsco Education. The two sets are the TETRIX MAX building system and the TETRIX PRIME building system. They are intended to be used as educational robotics and for competitions such as the FIRST Tech Challenge.

== History of Pitsco Education and Tetrix Robotics Kits ==
The company that developed the Tetrix Robotic Kits, Pitsco Education is a provider of K-12 STEM educational kits, activities, curricula, educational programs, and various learning experiences. The company is headquartered in Pittsburg, Kansas, United States. Originally named the Pittsburg Industrial Teachers Service Company, Pitsco Education was founded in 1971 by three teachers, Harvey Dean, Max Lundquest, and Terry Salmans. The first five years of operations were run by the three teachers and their families. In 1975, Harvey Dean acquired the full ownership of Pitsco. In the same year, Pitsco Education partnered with the Ideas and Solutions Big Book to form the Pitsco catalogue division. In between 1990 and 2001, Pitsco Education acquired the Canadian catalogue company, Advance School Equipment, and the Hearlihy & Co., Construction Education Systems (CES). This helped Pitsco Education to expand into Canada and acquire more resources. In 1997, Pitsco Education partnered with the LEGO Educational Division. They formed LEGO Education, which was originally named Pitsco LEGO Educational Division (PLED). This partnership between Pitsco Education and the LEGO Educational Division is responsible for the development of the TETRIX Robotics. From 1997 to 2014, Pitsco Education launched numerous initiatives, institutes and educational programs, including the Technological Fluency Institute (TFI), the Kindergarten to Careers initiative, the Pitsco Engineering Academy, selling STEM products on Amazon, and the STREAM Missions. The TETRIX MAX building system was developed in 2008, followed by the TETRIX PRIME building system in 2014. Then, In 2016, Pitsco Education released the TETRIX PRIZM Robotics Controller with the TETRIX PULSE™ Robotics Controller introduced in the following year. In 2018, PItsco Education became business partners with Microburst Learning and KUBO. In 2019, the partnership extended to Arduino, Microduino, UBTECH, and Shape Robotics.

== TETRIX MAX ==
The TETRIX MAX building system is designed for students aged 14 and above. The building system uses heavy-duty aircraft-grade aluminum which aims to increase stability, durability, and reliability. The TETRIX MAX building system is also known for having stronger drive motors and more precise servo motors amongst other educational robotic kits in the market. The various hardware included in the TETRIX MAX building system are compatible with most programmable controllers, allowing more versatility, and potential for various sophisticated tasks. The trademarked hole pattern in its building system enables connections at the increment of 45°. With additional building parts, the TETRIX MAX building system is also designed to be flexible and have great compatibility with other TETRIX parts, including TETRIX PRIME parts.

=== TETRIX MAX Robotics Parts ===
TETRIX MAX Robotics parts can be categorized into 12 types of parts. Firstly, there are the channels. TETRIX MAX Robotics building system utilizes structural channels (C-channels) as the main building blocks of its building system. These C-channels are all included with the trademarked hole pattern on all sides. This allows them to connect to all other structural parts as well as connect to axle hubs and motor brackets for the mounting of wheels or motorized wheels. These C-channels comes in 4 lengths, 32 mm, 96 mm, 160 mm, 288 mm. The next category of parts are bars and angles. These parts do not have the trademarked hole pattern nor the holes for connecting the axles. They only have connection points for the included screws. The TETRIX MAX Robotics building system offers the 288mm flat bar. It also has two lengths of angles (slotted angle), which are 144mm and 288mm. The next category of parts are plates and brackets. For plates, the TETRIX MAX Robotics building system offers one size of flat building plate which its main purpose is to create more connection points and building space. As for brackets, the TETRIX MAX Robotics building system offers five types in total. These are the Flat Building Bracket, the L Bracket, the Inside Corner Bracket, the Inside C Connector, and the Adjustable Angle Corner Bracket. A similarity that all of the plates and brackets share is that they all have the trademarked hole pattern. The next category of parts are the flats. These are oblong shaped flat bars that have one row of the trademarked hole pattern. They vary in 4 lengths, 64 mm, 96 mm, 160 mm, and 288 mm. This category of parts also offer the Adjustable Angle Flat Bracket. Moving on, the fifth category of parts are the axles, hubs, and spacers. This category of parts are dedicated to the connections between wheels, axles, gears, and structural parts. There are the Motor Hub, the Axle Hub, the Axle Set Collar, the 100 mm Axle, the Bronze Bushing, the Gear Hub Spacer, the 1/8″ Axle Spacer, the 3/8″ Axle Spacer, and the Flat Round Spacer. The next category of parts are gears. The TETRIX MAX Robotics building system offers gears of two tooth count, 40-tooth and 80-tooth. The seventh category of parts are the standoffs. The TETRIX MAX Robotics building system offers standoffs in 4 lengths, 1″, 2″, 32 mm, and 16 mm. The next category of TETRIX MAX Robotics parts are servos and hardware. This includes the servomotor, its cables, various mounting brackets designated mounting brackets. To be more specific, the servomotor is the 180° Standard-Scale HS-458HB Servo Motor, the cables including the Servo Extension and the Servo Y Connector. TETRIX MAX Robotics building system also includes numerous servomotor mounting kits and brackets. These include the Single Standard-Scale Servo Motor Bracket, the Standard-Scale Pivot Arm with Bearing, the Standard Servo Mounting Kit, and the Adjustable Servo Brackets. The next Category are DC motors and hardware. These include the Motor Mount, the TETRIX MAX DC Gear Motor, and the Motor Power Cable. Moving on, the tenth category are tires and wheels. The TETRIX MAX Robotics building system provides two type of wheel. There is the standard TETRIX MAX 4″ Wheel and the TETRIX MAX 4″ Omni Wheel. The next category of parts are nuts, screws, and fasteners. These are the parts used to fasten all of the parts together. The TETRIX MAX Robotics building system provides only Kep Nuts, but have three types of screws. Firstly, there are two lengths of 6-32 Socket Head Cap Screws, 1/2″ and 5/16″. The third type of screw is the 3/8″ Button Head Cap Screw. Various TETRIX MAX Robotic kit also comes with Zip Ties. The next category of parts are Batteries and Chargers. These parts are the Battery Mounting Clips, the TETRIX MAX 12-volt 3,000 mAh Battery and the MAX 12-volt Battery Charger. Moving on, the next category are tool. TETRIX MAX Robotic kits also comes with numerous tools including, the 4-in-1 Screwdriver, the TETRIX Wrench Set, the TETRIX MAX Hex Key Pack, Miniature Ball-Point Hex Driver and the 2-in-1 Screwdriver. Lastly, the fourteenth category of parts are electronics and controls. These include the TETRIX Wireless Joystick Gamepad System with Receiver, the TETRIX MAX R/C Motor Controller, the TETRIX On/Off Power Switch, and the TETRIX R/C Components Mounting Kit.

=== TETRIX PRIZM Robotics Controller ===
The TETRIX PRIZM Robotics Controller is a fully-integrated programmable controller for the TETRIX MAX building system. It has multiple ports to control motors, servos, encoders and sensors, and also provides connections intended for use with TETRIX MAX hardware. The controller is powered by the Arduino Software (IDE), available for Windows, Mac OS X 10.7 and newer, and some Linux devices.

TETRIX PRIZM Robotics Controller Specifications:

- ATmega328P microcontroller
- 32 KB of memory
- 7 ports for sensors (3 for analog sensors and 4 for digital sensors)
- 2 ports for DC motor control
- 8 ports for servo control
- 1 expansion port for more motor connections
- 1 I²C port and 1 USB port
- 2 sets of battery connection
- 2 push buttons (start and stop/reset)

== TETRIX PRIME ==
The TETRIX PRIME building system is designed for students aged 12 and above. It was developed with the purpose to foster the growth of technical building skills for new or inexperienced users. The building system consists of aluminum and plastic pieces including structural elements, connectors, hubs, brackets, wheels, and gears. Designed for middle school students, It is made to be easy and quick to build. This is achieved using thumbscrews for connections. There are multiple distinct features that separates the TETRIX PRIME building system from the TETRIX MAX building system. Firstly, the TETRIX PRIME building system has smaller parts than that of the TETRIX MAX building system. Secondly, unlike the TETRIX PRIME building system utilizes square beams as the main structural element. Compared to the TETRIX MAX building system, the TETRIX PRIME building system allows for more detailed constructions. This is due to its smaller size and square shaped beams.

=== TETRIX PRIME Robotics Parts ===
TETRIX PRIME Robotics parts can be categorized into 8 categories. Firstly, there are the beams. The TETRIX PRIME Robotics building system utilizes hollow square beams as the main building blocks of its building system. These beams have connection holes on all sides. There are two types of holes, one is for fastening parts together and the other is for axles. The two types of holes are evenly spread over all sides of the beams alternatively. The TETRIX PRIME Robotics building system offers 7 lengths of these beams measured by the number of fastening holes on each side. The 7 lengths of beams are the 4-Hole Square Beam, the 5-Hole Square Beam, the 6-Hole Square Beam, the 7-Hole Square Beam, the 8-Hole Square Beam, the 13-Hole Square Beam, and the 15-Hole Square Beam. The next category of parts are the internal connectors. The internal connectors are connector parts that can be inserted into the square beams to attach them. The TETRIX PRIME Robotics building system offers 6 types of internal connectors. These are the 3-Way Beam Connector, the Tee Beam Connector, the 90-Degree Beam Connector, Beam End Connector, Beam Extension Connector, and the Beam Straight Connector. Moving on, the third category are the external connectors. The external connectors are connection parts that attaches the beams together externally. The TETRIX PRIME Robotics building system offers 5 types of external connectors. These are the 90-Degree Beam Bracket, the 60-Degree Beam Bracket, the Tee Beam Bracket, the Straight Block Beam Connector, and the 90-Degree Cross Block Connector. Next, the forth category of parts are the connecting hardware. The TETRIX PRIME Robotics building system offers various types of connecting hardware. There are the Quick Rivet Connector and the Quick Rivet Peg, Wing Nuts and Thumbscrews and Cap Screws. Following, the fifth category of parts are wheels, gears, and servos. Firstly, the TETRIX PRIME Robotics building system offers one type of wheels, the TETRIX PRIME Wheel with Tire. For gears, there are gears of two tooth count, there is the 40-Tooth Plastic gear and the 80-Tooth Plastic Gear. As for servomotors, The TETRIX PRIME Robotics building system provides the Standard-Scale Servo Motor and the Continuous Rotation Servo Motor, both of which can be mounting using the same type of provided Servo Mounting Bracket. Moving on, the next category of parts are Axles, Hubs, and Spacers. These parts are the Shaft Servo Hub, the 80 mm Steel Axle, the 40 mm Steel Axle, the 8 mm x 6 mm Bronze Bushing, the Beam Attachment Hub, and the D-Shaft Set Collar. Next, the seventh category of parts are gripper assembly and controllers. These are the TETRIX PRIME Gripper Kit and the TETRIX Wireless Joystick Gamepad System with Receiver. Finally, the eighth category of parts are batteries, tools, and others. Firstly for batteries, the TETRIX PRIME Robotics building system provides the 6 V NiMH Batter Pack which can be mounted using the Batter Mount Bracket. There are also the Battery Pack On/Off Switch and the 5-Cell NiMH Battery Pack Charger. Moving on, for tools, there are the 4-in1 Screwdriver, Miniature Ball-Point Hex Driver and the 2-in1 Screwdriver. Lastly, some TETRIX PRIME Robotic Kits also provide other things like Plastic 2 oz Cups, Practice Golf Balls, and/or Tetrix PRIME Builder's Guide.

=== TETRIX PULSE Robotics Controller ===
The TETRIX PULSE Robotics Controller is a fully integrated programmable controller that is designed specifically for the TETRIX PRIME building system. Same as the TETRIX PRIME building system, it is also designed for middle school students, people aged 12 or above. It features the Arduino Software (IDE) and the TETRIX Ardublockly software. The TETRIX Ardublockly software is an entry level programming software. It combines graphics and syntax-based coding to create a visual learning experience for beginners. Programming in the TETRIX Ardublockly software is done by dragging and dropping building blocks in the software. For a more advanced experience, users can use the Arduino Software (IDE) and the PULSE Arduino Library.

TETRIX PULSE Robotics Controller Specifications:

- ATmega328P microcontroller
- 32 KB of memory
- 2 ports for DC motor control
- 6 ports for servo control
- 3 ports for digital sensors
- 1 I²C port and 1 USB port
- 1 battery connection port
- 1 on/off switch
- 2 push buttons (start and stop/reset)

=== TETRIX PRIME EV3 Module ===
The TETRIX PRIME EV3 Module is made to connect the sensor port of a LEGO EV3 Brick, from a Lego Mindstorms EV3 kit. It enables the users to control their TETRIX PRIME robots using LEGO EV3 programming. It also enables the users to use Lego Mindstorms EV3 sensors and motors in their TETRIX PRIME robots. The TETRIX PRIME EV3 Module has six ports for TETRIX PRIME servo motors and two ports for TETRIX PRIME DC motors.

== Educational Uses ==
The Tetrix Robotics kits are educational robotics. They are designed for K-12 students. However, it also has the potential to support students in higher education and be used to teach higher level engineering concepts. The difficulties of Tetrix robotics builds can be categorized into three levels. The introductory level of build are Tetrix robots that are remote controlled mobile robots. The second level of difficulty revolves around the use of software tools to program Tetrix robots for various tasks. The most advanced level of Tetrix robotics builds for K-12 students incorporates higher level engineering concepts, using Tetrix Robotics kits as educational robotics and a vehicle to teach engineering concepts. The expected learning outcomes of the Tetrix Robotics kits as educational robotics includes the development of problem solving skills, self-efficacy, computational thinking, creativity, motivation, and collaboration. Some educational institutes even combine Tetrix Robotics kits with other third-party hardware and software for various teaching purposes.

== TETRIX FIRST Tech Challenge Competition Set ==
Pitsco Educations partnered with US FIRST to create the TETRIX FIRST Tech Challenge Competition Set. The set consists of parts exclusively from the TETRIX MAX building system. Electronic components that are included in this set are four TETRIX MAX TorqueNADO Motors and a 12-volt 3,000 mAh battery.
