= Terrainability =

Ability of a machine to travel across irregular terrain

The terrainability of a machine or robot is defined as its ability to negotiate terrain irregularities.

Terrainability is a term coined in the research community and related to locomotion in the field of mobile robotics. Its various definitions generically describe the ability of the robot to handle various terrains in terms of their ground support, obstacle sizes and spacing, passive/dynamic stability, etc.
