= Whegs =

Whegs (wheel-legs or wing-legs) are mechanisms for robot locomotion. Whegs use a strategy of locomotion that combines the simplicity of the wheel with the obstacle-clearing advantages of the foot.

Whegs were pioneered at the Biologically Inspired Robotics Laboratory at Case Western Reserve University. The development of the whegs concept has been done in collaboration with the Ritzmann lab in the Biology department at Case Western Reserve University. The system is inspired by and based on studies of cockroach climbing behavior.

Whegs robots were inspired by the Prolero robot, designed in 1996 at the European Space Agency, and the RHex robot, developed by a multiuniversity effort funded by the Defense Advanced Research Projects Agency.

Wing-legs are found on flying robots and are wings dual-purposed as legs for locomotion when the robot is on the ground.
