= Cubelets =

Construction toy

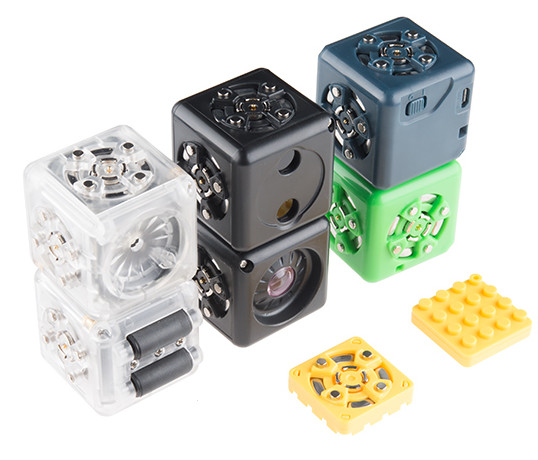
A set of Cubelets, including a temperature and light sensing cubes (black), and speaker and drive cubes (transparent)

Cubelets are a line of modular robotic construction toys manufactured by Modular Robotics. Cubelets are small robots that connect to create larger robot constructions, a kind of modular robot. Cubelets connect magnetically with data and power passing through a genderless connector. Cubelets are sometimes used in educational settings such as K-12 classrooms and museum exhibits.

== Operation ==
Each kind of Cubelet has a unique function and behavior. There are three categories of Cubelets - Sense, Think, and Act:

- Sense Cubelets detect properties of the environment and turn them into data.
- Think Cubelets modify and can share data throughout the robot construction.
- Act Cubelets take the data they receive and turn it into action, like motion, sound or light.

== MOSS system ==
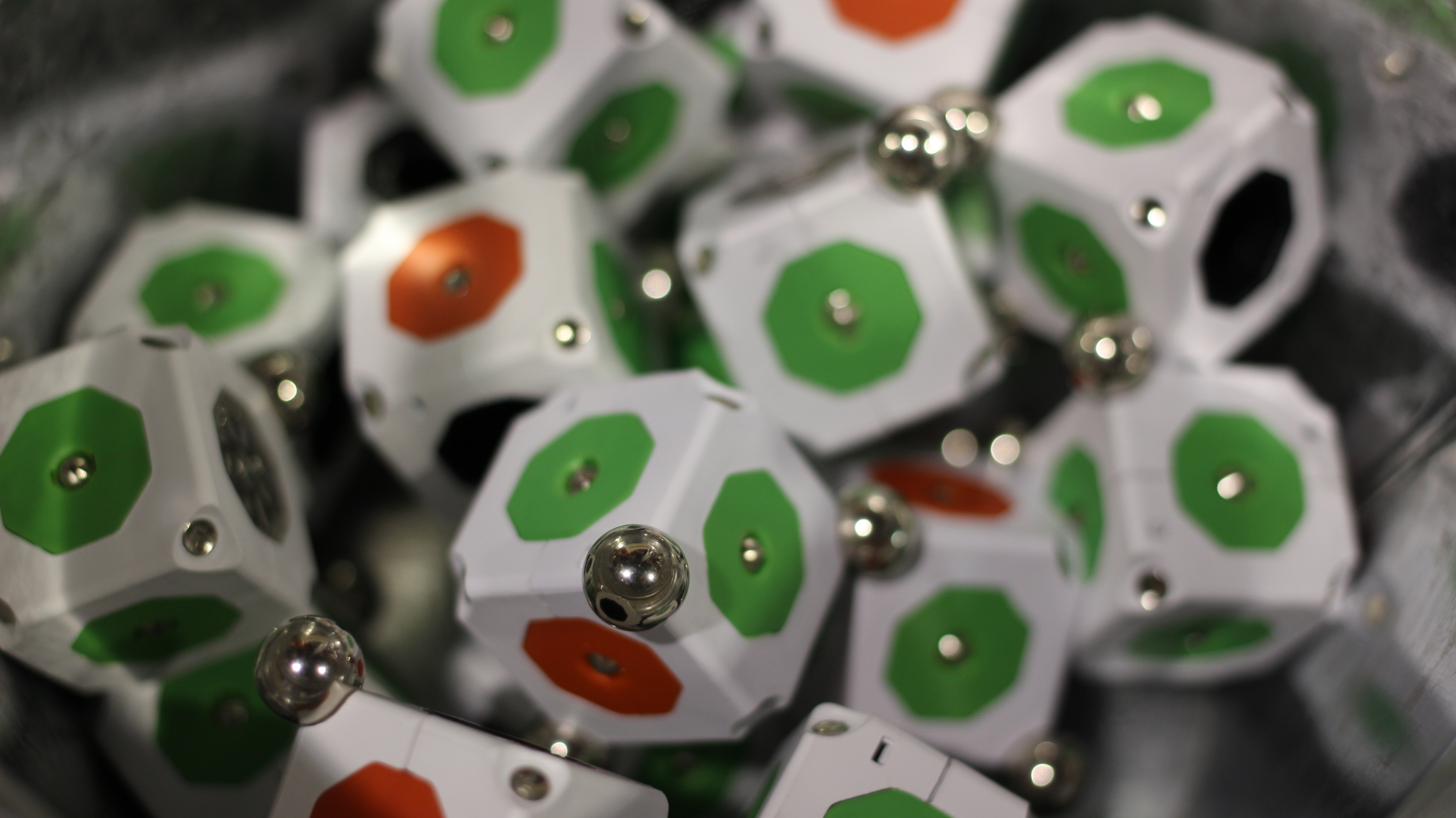
MOSS modules

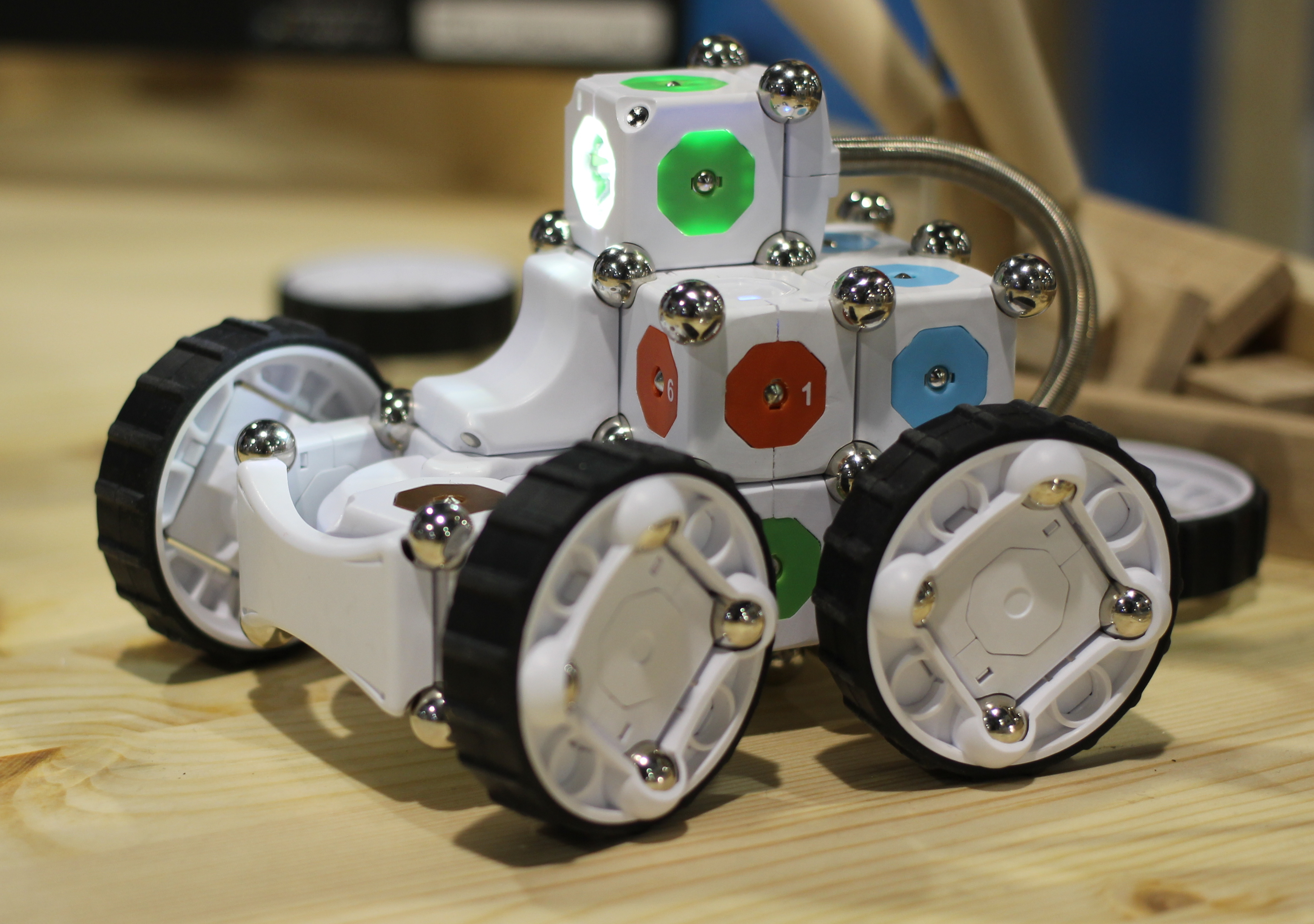
A MOSS remote control car

In 2013 Modular Robotics launched the MOSS robot construction system, a line of construction toys similar to Cubelets. MOSS modules connect via steel spheres and magnets located at the corner of each module. Each module has a specific function and combines to create a variety of simple robots.
