= Hexbug =

Robotic insect toy automatons

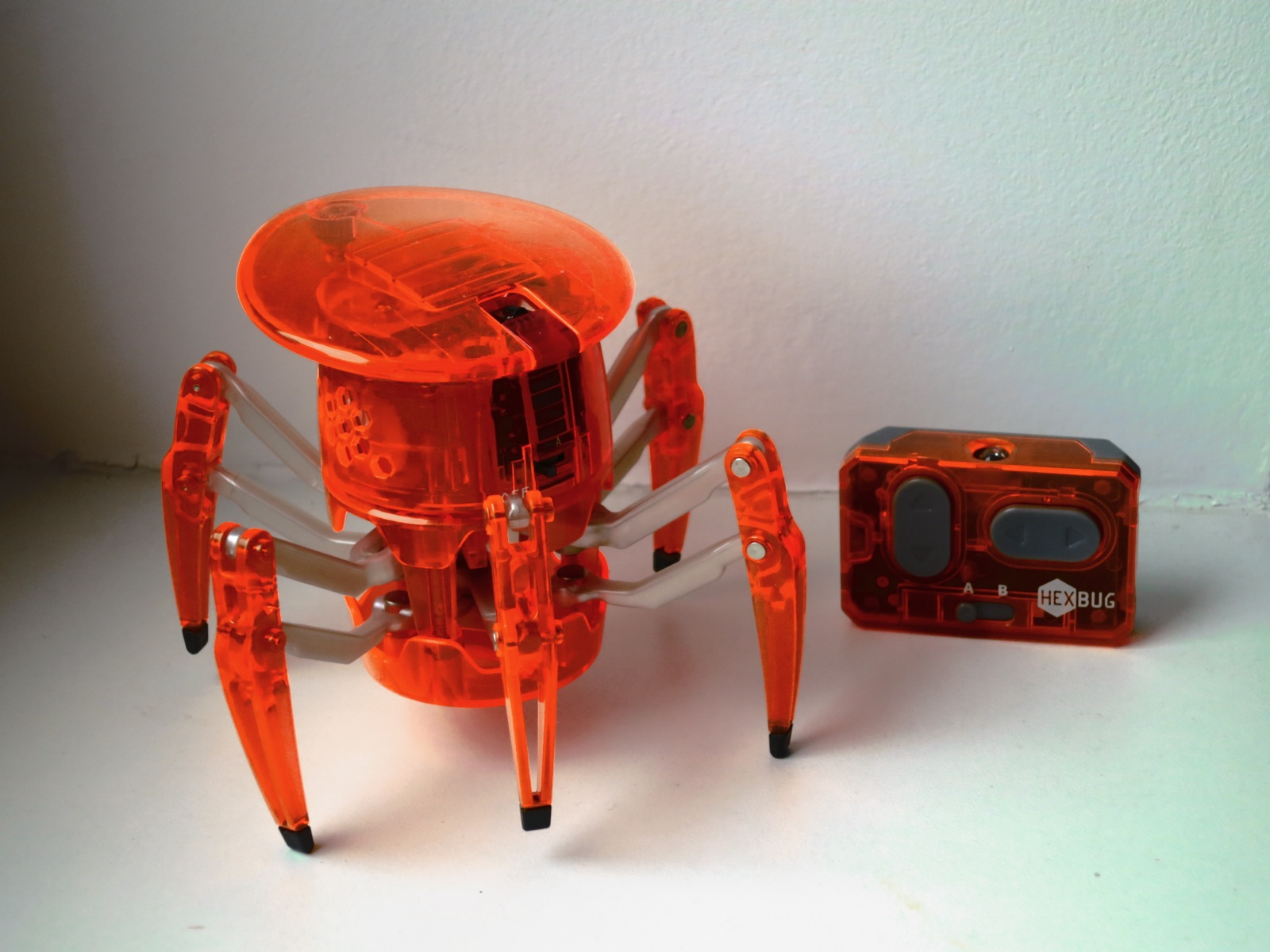
- Hexbug Spider with IR remote control
- Type: Toy Automatons; IR Controlled Toys
- Genre: Robotic toys
- Founded: 2007
- Headquarters: Toronto, Canada
- Parent: Spin Master
- Website: www.hexbug.com The website is as of date (September 2024) outdated and does not sell anything.

Hexbug (stylized as HEXBUG) is a brand of infrared and automaton toys developed and distributed by Spin Master. HEXBUG uses many elements found in BEAM robotics. First piloted in the US through RadioShack, HEXBUG is now sold in most major retail stores. The original HEXBUGs are based on six-legged arthropods but now come in several different varieties. The name "HEXBUG" refers to the six-sided packaging in which it is sold, rather than its number of legs.

== History ==
HEXBUG was founded in 2007 in Greenville, Texas, by Innovation First International, Inc., a company that was founded in 1996 to develop small-scale robotic products, mostly for The FIRST Robotics Competition. HEXBUG was designed to expand the company's presence in the retail toy market, as well as add to the experience created by VEX Robotics, a subsidiary brand of Innovation First International, Inc. that specializes in robotics built in a fashion similar to Erector Sets, and Rack Solutions, which is an engineering firm that specializes in information technology products. However, in 2023, HEXBUG was acquired by Spin Master, and renamed to Hex Bot.Hex Bots, Spin Master, 2025-04-03

Some products of HEXBUG have been sold abroad, such as in Japan by toymaker Bandai. The packaging in these international versions differs slightly, as the HEXBUG logo is blue instead of its signature orange and grey appearance, but the products still retain their signature hexagonal packaging.

Various product lines have been sold under the HEXBUG name, such as the nano, BattleBots, Micro Titans, Mechanicals, HEXMODS, JunkBots, and MoBots series. Additionally, separate products, such as cat toys and board games have been released.

== Products ==
Note that the listed HEXBUGs do not include every model ever released, just some of the more important ones.

=== Original ===
The Original HEXBUG model is a toy that reacts to loud sounds and pressure on its antennae and scurries around the room. Designed after a beetle, it was available in five different shapes and colors: Alpha (orange), Bravo (green), Charlie (blue), Delta (yellow), and Echo (red). The toy debuted in 2007 at RadioShack stores. A similar redesign would be introduced later, fittingly called the "Beetle".

=== Inchworm ===
The Inchworm was the first IR-controlled mechanical bug, which utilized a remote that allowed free motion about its center and inched around with two sets of legs, hence the "inchworm". The Inchworm came in five colors: Green, Red, Indigo, Black, and Plum. The Inchworm also debuted in the Fall of 2008 along with the Crab. Despite being called an "Inchworm", this product only resembles the Inchworm in that it inches around; visually, there is no resemblance.

=== Ant ===
The Ant is a 6-cm (2.3-inches) long micro robotic insect that has front and rear touch sensors that allow it to maneuver around objects in its path, while its wheel legs enable the robotic ant to move around ten times faster than any previous HEXBUG robot. It was released in April 2009.

=== Beetle (hi-tech Beetle) ===
The hi-tech HEXBUG Beetle, a micro robotic creature, will travel in a straight line until it hits an object in its path or hears a loud noise. Upon contact or noise, the bug reverses in a half circle, and then moves forward in a new direction. Featuring bump sensor feelers, it crawls and senses objects. It is available in multiple colors and comes with two batteries. It is suitable for children eight years of age and older.

=== Spider ===
The Spider is a remote-controlled hexapod robot able to change direction by its head rotation. The head presses the leg joints into moving forward in the direction where the head is pointed. It is powered by three replaceable LR44 (AG13) Button cell batteries.

=== Battle Spider 1.0 ===
The Battle Spider is a variant of the Spider. Equipped with an LED light and sensor, it can engage in laser-tag battle. Unlike the standard Spider and the Battle Spider 2.0, the first edition of the Battle Spider can only move forward. It is powered by three replaceable LR44 (AG13) batteries.

=== Battle Spider 2.0 ===
The Battle Spider 2.0 is a revised edition of the Battle Spider. It can walk backwards like the original Spider and is powered by three replaceable LR44 (AG13) batteries.

=== Scarab ===
The Scarab is a fast-moving mechanical robot made to resemble a beetle with six legs. Its movement is autonomous and random, reacting to obstacles with a rapid change in direction. The Scarab automatically will return to its feet if it is upside-down. Internal gears and motors are visible through its translucent shell. It is powered by three replaceable LR44 (AG13) batteries.

=== Tarantula ===
The Tarantula is an eight-legged remote-controlled robot resembling the Strandbeast. It can move in all directions as well as rotate.

=== Battle Tarantula ===
The Battle Tarantula features the same functions as the Tarantula but can shoot and move.

=== Nano Nitro ===
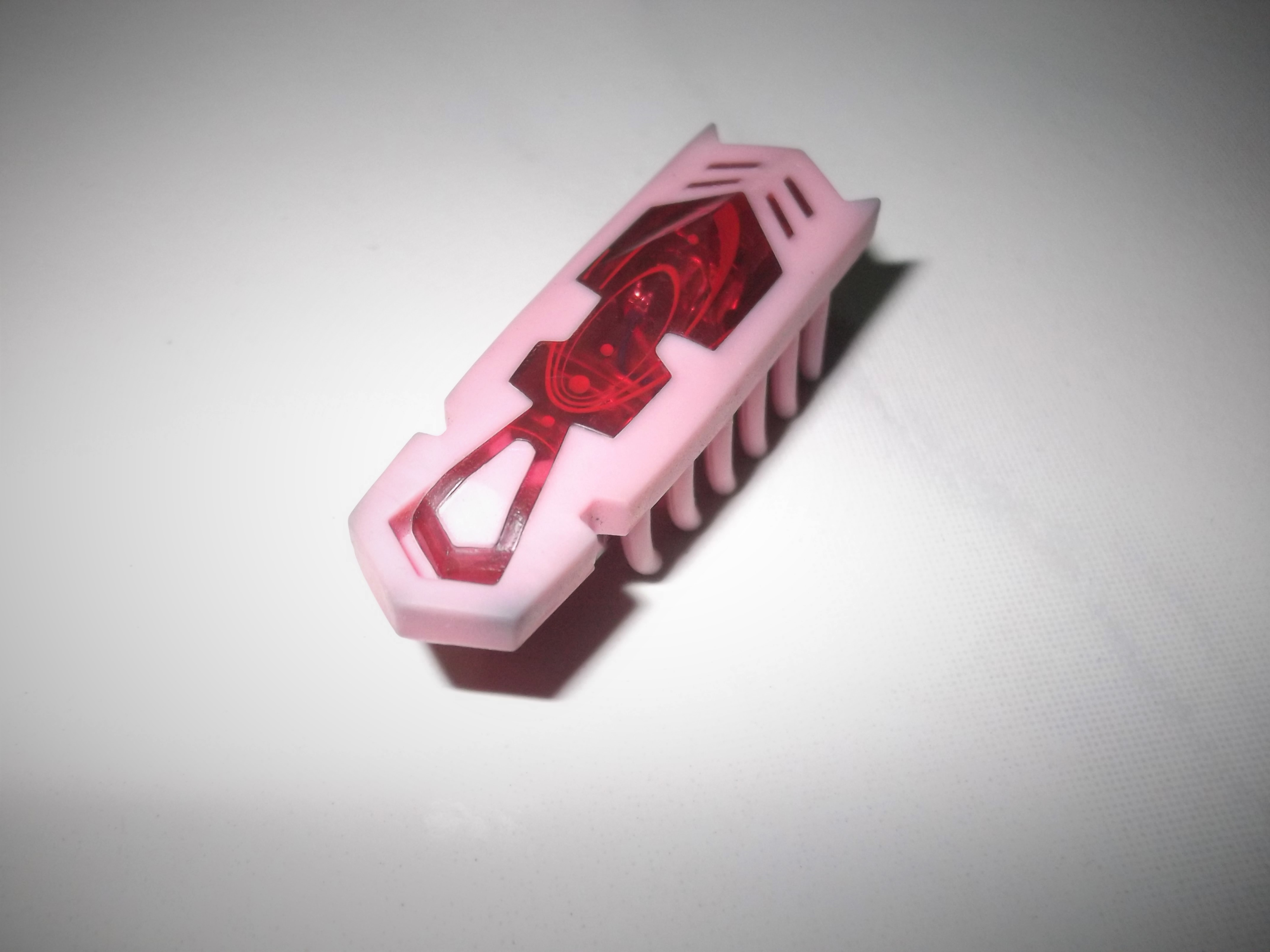
Hexbug Nano

A development of the Nano v2 (2013) was released in 2017. These bugs, like their v2 and original counterparts, are also bristlebots. An improvement is that they have five spines on their back rather than the v2's three spines. Another improvement is reduced oscillation, allowing the bugs to move faster. Their spines enable them to climb vertically between two suitably spaced plates or tube walls. The five spines on their backs enhance their stability compared to the v2, particularly when self-righting from their backs.

A variety of clear plastic tube habitats are offered with the toys, ranging from a simple vertical tube for climbing, through to multi-bot habitats in clear plastic, with horizontal arenas linked by curved climbing tubes. Additional construction set tube parts are also available, including twisted tubes, funnels, and black holes.

=== Aquabot ===
A line of miniature robotic fish was released in 2013. Their built-in sensors detect liquid, which activates the caudal fin for propulsion through the water. Available as a fish, jellyfish, wahoo, and seahorse.

=== VEX Robotics ===
A line of construction sets for building robots, VEX Robotics kits allow a player to build their own contraptions as well as up-scaled versions of Hexbug products. It is named after the VEX Robotics learning platform developed by Innovation First, which was prominently utilized for STEM education.

=== Robotic Soccer ===
These car-like robots play soccer.

==== BattleBots ====
A Line of Robots to imitate the show BattleBots. There have been many lines of Rivals sets over the years, the Build-Your-Own-Bot, and multiple variations of the battlebox. It allows the people who are playing with them to use a pair of infrared controllers with horizontal and vertical movement, as well as a top feet which allows the person to activate their weapon. The goal is to knock off all of your opponents' removable plates to simulate damage.

=== Discontinued versions ===
==== Crab ====
The Crab was the second HEXBUG mechanical bug. It only moved sideways and reacted to obstacles, light, and sound by reversing direction. It was withdrawn in September 2014, most likely due to a common defect with its back legs. The Crab came in five separate colors: Green, Red, Black, Indigo, and Turquoise. This model debuted in Fall 2008.

==== Larva ====
The Larva was a worm-like robot with an infrared eye which avoided objects in its path. Its battery use, however, was very strong. It was withdrawn in February 2015.

HexBugs work by vibrating, which causes them to move sporadically and unpredictably, similar to the insects after which they were modelled.

== See also ==
- Hexapod (robotics)
