= LAURON =

LAURON IVc
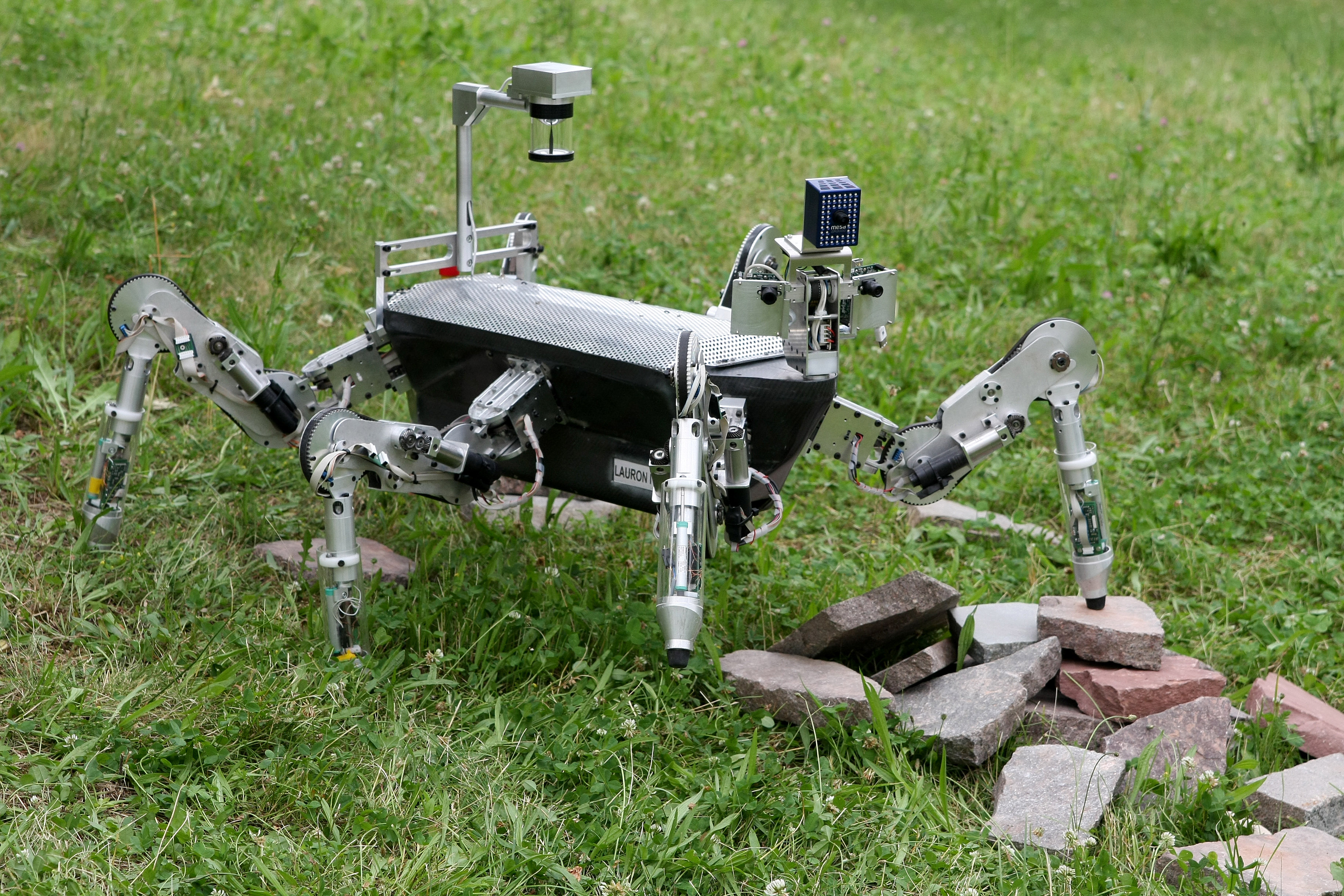
- Six-legged walking robot LAURON IVc (2009)

LAURON is a six-legged walking robot, which is being developed at the FZI Forschungszentrum Informatik in Germany. The mechanics and the movements of the robot are biologically-inspired, mimicking the stick insect Carausius Morosus. The development of the LAURON walking robot started with basic research in field of six-legged locomotion in the early 1990s and led to the first robot, called LAURON. In the year 1994, this robot was presented to public at the CeBIT in Hanover. This first LAURON generation was, in contrast to the current generation, controlled by an artificial neural network, hence the robot's German name: LAUfROboter Neuronal gesteuert (English: Walking Robot, Neural Controlled). The current generation LARUON V was finished in 2013.

LAURON V
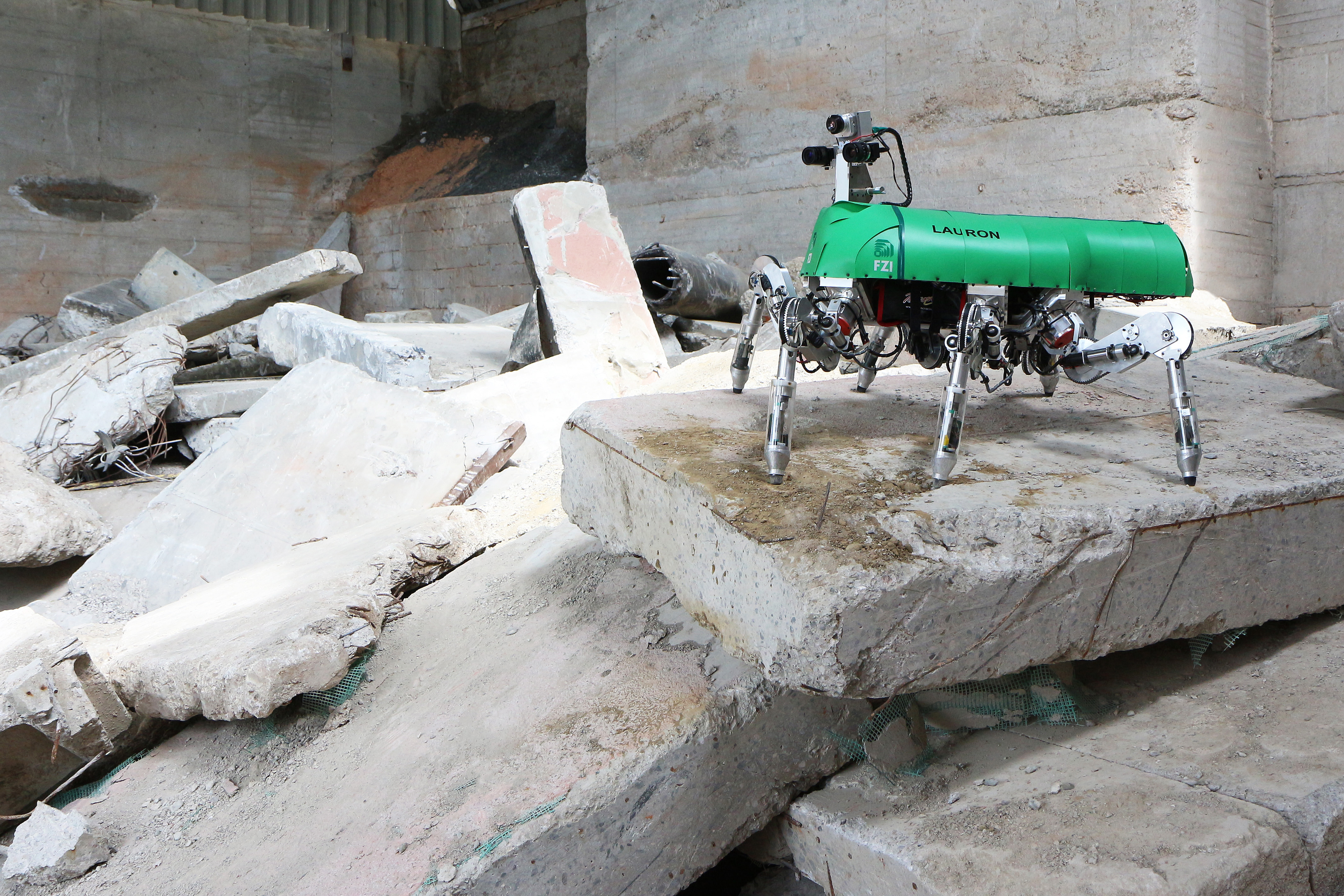
- Six-legged walking robot LAURON V at Taranis Field Exercise (2013)

== Overview ==
This biologically-inspired walking robot was developed to study and realize statically stable walking in rough terrain. Because of the flexible behavior- based control system, LAURON is capable of adapting to unknown situations very well. Through the robust mechanical design, different walking patterns and high number of degrees of freedom, LAURON can maintain a stable locomotion even under extreme circumstances.

A panoramic camera was installed on the back of LAURON for teleoperation tasks. This camera gives the operator a good overview of the robot and its local environment at all times. By the use of augmented reality glasses the operator can see additional status information overlaid onto the camera images and displayed in the glasses.

LAURON is able to gather information about its environment and plan a path towards a given goal autonomously. While walking LAURON can detect obstacles and then either walk over them or around them, if the obstacles are too high

The walking robot is intended to be used in inspection and maintenance tasks in rough and for humans hazardous areas like landmine detection, exploration of volcanoes or search and rescue missions after natural disasters.

== Models ==
=== LAURON I (since approx. 1994) ===
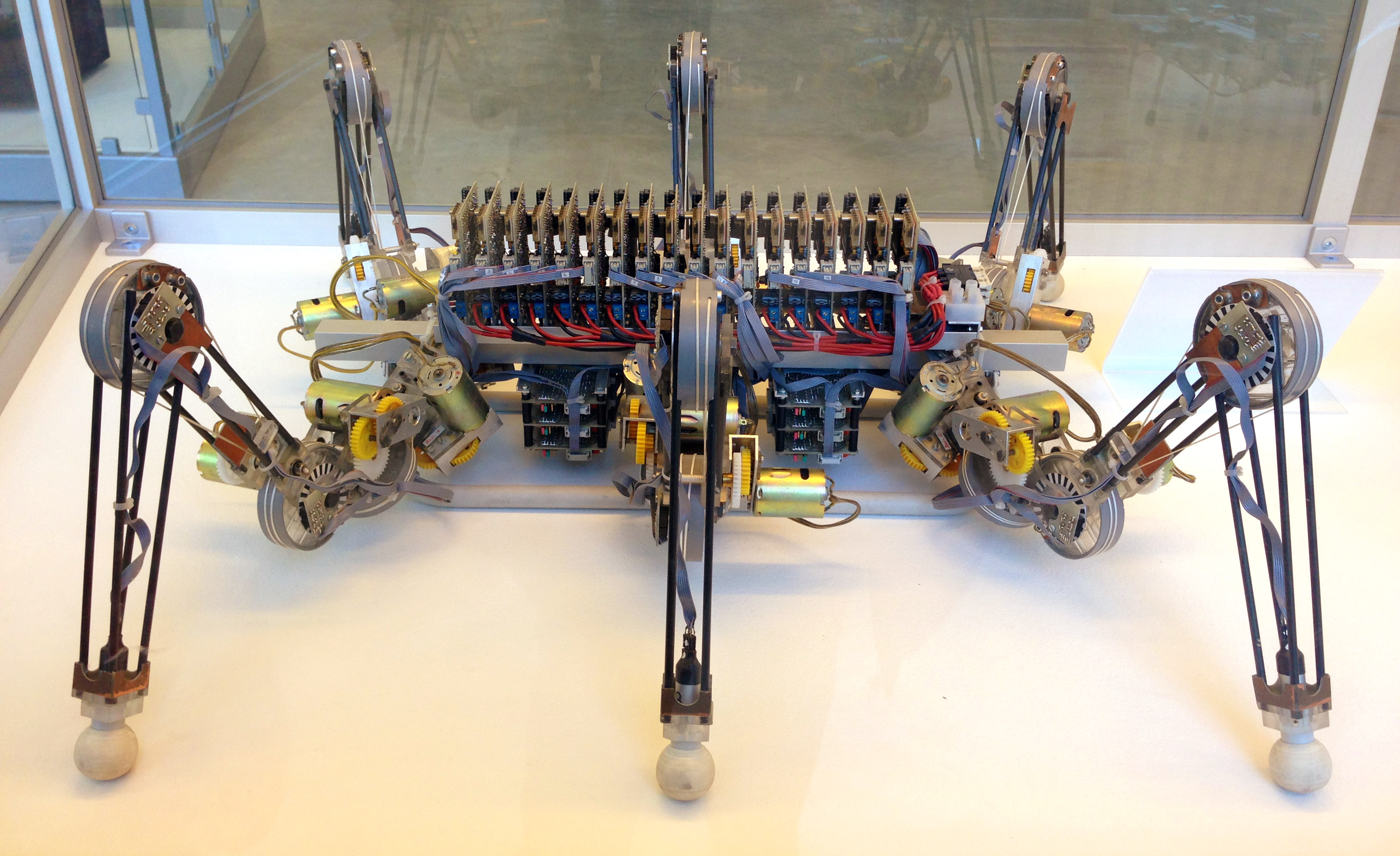
LAURON I - now in the biggest German museum of science and technology Deutsches Museum

LAURON I was finished in late 1993 and then presented to public at the CeBit 1994. It was constructed of aluminum and fiber-reinforced plastics with an overall weight of 11 kg. The robot was controlled by artificial neural networks. The construction and design was strongly inspired by the stick insect.

=== LAURON II (since approx. 1995) ===
The second generation of LAURON was developed and built from 1995–96. The main features were a changed mechanical design and some additional sensors like force sensors in the feet and an inclinometer. Because the new legs were now built of aluminum the overall weight of LAURON II increased to 16 kg. It has a maximum payload of 20 kg and a maximum speed of 50 cm/s LAURON II was used as a test platform for validating various control strategies and for machine learning.

=== LAURON III (since approx. 1999) ===
In 1999 the third LAURON generation was built. With an overall weight of 18 kg the robot was now able to carry a payload of up to 10 kg. Each leg has three degrees of freedom, and each foot has force sensors on all three axes. The artificial neural networks of the previous generations were replaced by a modular reactive control system. Now, the research focus shifted to topics like robot localization, navigation and environment modeling.

=== LAURON IV (since approx. 2004) ===
The fourth generation of LAURON was finished in 2004. The mechanical robustness was improved, for example the round cord belt connecting the joints with the motors were replaced by gear belts. Beside, a new head with 2 degrees of freedom was added. The central body was now made of light-weight carbon fiber. LAURON IV weights 27 kg including its accumulators and can reach a maximum walking speed of up to 0.22 m/s. Furthermore, the used NiMH accumulators can supply LAURON with energy for up to 60 minutes. The current version of the fourth LAURON generation is LAURON IVc. The LAURON IV won the Faulhaber University Project Award in 2011.

=== LAURON V (since approx. 2013) ===
The fifth LAURON generation was introduced and demonstrated at the International Conference on Robotics and Automation (ICRA) 2013 in Karlsruhe Germany. The flexibility and maneuverability of LAURON V was improved by adding another rotational joint to each leg close to the main body. This joint enlarged each leg's workspace and allows LAURON to orient its feet towards the ground. The mounting angles of the six legs were optimized to additionally increase the overall workspace, improve the support polygon, and enable LAURON V to manipulate objects with its front legs. With its insect like kinematic structure and behavior-based control system LAURON is able to cope with difficult, rough terrain.
