= Stiquito =

Stiquito (pronounced sti ke to) is a small, inexpensive hexapod (i.e., six-legged) robot commonly used by universities, high schools, and hobbyists, since 1992.

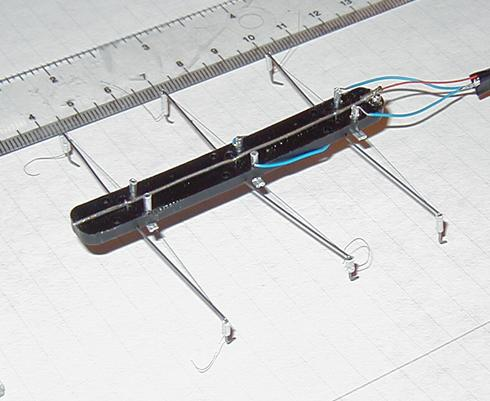
A Stiquito.

Stiquito's "muscles" are made of nitinol, a shape memory alloy that expands and contracts, roughly emulating the operation of a muscle. The application of heat causes a crystalline structure change in the wire. Nitinol contracts when heated and returns to its original size and shape when cooled.

Stiquito was developed by Jonathan W. Mills of Indiana University as an inexpensive vehicle for his research. He soon found its applications extended to educational uses. It has been used to introduce students to the concepts of analogue electronics, digital electronics, computer control, and robotics. It has also been used for advanced topics such as subsumption architectures, artificial intelligence, and advanced computer architecture.
