= FZI Forschungszentrum Informatik =

Research institute in Karlsruhe, Germany

- Established: 1985
- Faculty: Informatics
- Key people: Jan Wiesenberger, Stefan Nickel, J. Marius Zöllner (executive directors)
- Members: 273 staff members, including 172 research assistants (as of 2023)
- Location: Karlsruhe, Baden-Württemberg, Germany
- Website: www.fzi.de/en/

The FZI Forschungszentrum Informatik ("Research Center for Information Technology"), is a non-profit research institute for applied computer science and informatics research and technology transfer. It was established in 1985 by Wirtschaftsministerium Baden-Württemberg and Karlsruhe University (now the Karlsruhe Institute of Technology). The goal of the FZI is to research and develop innovations for the benefit of society and to qualify researchers for their work. FZI has very close collaborations with Karlsruhe Institute of Technology (KIT), but is not affiliated to KIT Karlsruhe. The FZI has its headquarters in Karlsruhe, Germany, and also runs a branch office in Berlin, Germany.

== Task and research areas ==
According to its statutes, the task of the non-profit research institution is to bring the latest scientific findings in information technology as practicable solutions to companies and public institutions. In doing so, the FZI qualifies young people for an academic career, a professional entry into business or even the leap into self-employment. The members of the Board of Scientific Directors, around 25 professors from various universities, accompany the research groups at the FZI – bundled into six research divisions – with their professional, scientific excellence in the disciplines of informatics, economics, electrical engineering, mechanical engineering and legal sciences. As a non-profit foundation under civil law (German: Stiftung), the FZI works for and in cooperation with companies and public institutions of all sizes: from small businesses to corporations and administrations at regional, federal and EU level.

The interdisciplinarily working scientists at the FZI dedicate themselves to the following fields of application of informatics:

- Education, research and administration
- Services and commerce
- Energy
- Buildings and public space
- Healthcare
- Information and communication technology
- Mobility, transportation and logistics
- Production
- Supply and disposal

== Memberships and engagements ==
The FZI is an innovation partner of KIT, as well as a member of the innovation alliance innBW and a shareholder of the innovation alliance Karlsruhe TechnologyRegion. In May 2015, the FZI and the German Informatics Society (GI) also announced their strategic partnership that aims to promote pathways of education in the field of informatics, political agenda-setting and a positive and contemporary understanding of ICT in society. Together with the entrepreneur network CyberForum e.V., the FZI coordinates the DIZ | Digital Innovation Center.

== Branch office in Berlin ==
The FZI Research Center for Information Technology has its headquarters in Karlsruhe and, since 2011, also runs a branch office in Berlin. The office in the German capital also serves as a showcase for the activities of the Karlsruhe headquarters and is intended to support the cooperation with federal ministries and Berlin-based representations of major associations and organizations. In line with the Baden-Württemberg Ministry of Economy, the FZI in Berlin represents the innovation alliance innBW of Baden-Württemberg.

== House of Living Labs ==
The FZI House of Living Labs encompasses all Living Labs of the FZI that are set up to cover the subjects Future Mobility, Industrial Intelligence, Security and Law, Service Robotics, smartEnergy, smartHome/AAL, and Software Innovations. It offers companies a space to discuss and further develop their research approaches or products jointly with FZI scientists. The "Living Labs" research concept aims to involve users right from the start in the product development and to test partial results in environments that are as close to reality as possible. The idea of the FZI House of Living Labs extends this concept based on the approach of the "Out-of-Box-Thinking": For the benefit of scientists and industrial partners, the adjacent existence of various application areas in the FZI House of Living Labs is designed to facilitate the development of new solutions that reach beyond their own subject area. In 2014, Stefan Hellfeld described the FZI House of Living Labs as being set up in such a way that a complete daily routine can be mapped: You wake up in the FZI Living Lab smartHome/Ambient Assisted Living, then make your way to work in the FZI Living Lab Automotive or smartMobility. You pass your day, for example, in the FZI Living Lab "Service Robotics", working jointly with industrial robots in production, before returning home in the evening. Thus, at the FZI, the concept of the FZI House of Living Labs is understood as an extension of the "Living Labs" research approach.
