= Rhex =

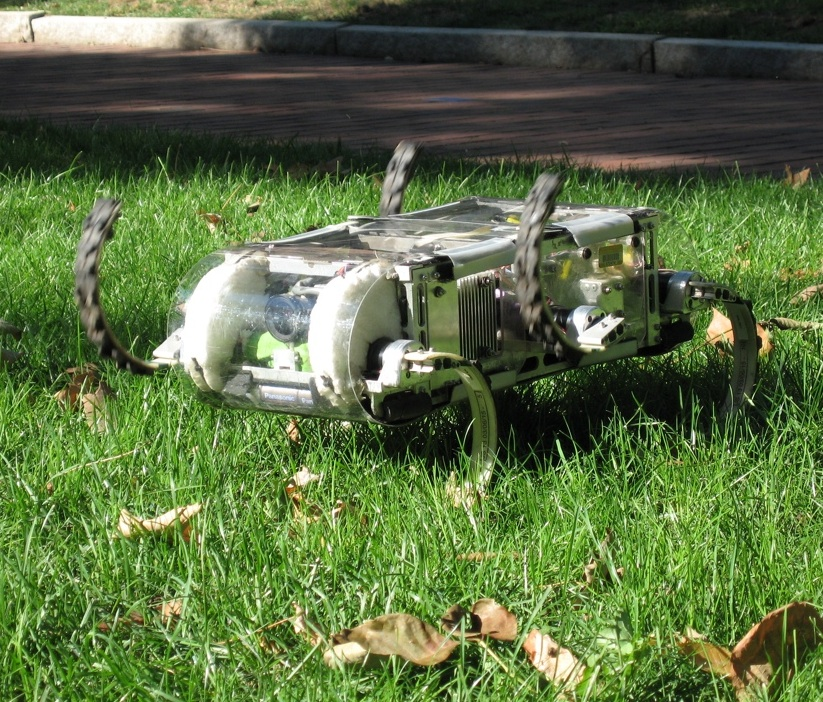
RHex 1.1 running.

RHex is an autonomous robot design, based on hexapod with compliant legs and one actuator per leg. A number of US universities have participated, with funding grants also coming from DARPA.

Versions have shown good mobility over a wide range of terrain types at speeds exceeding five body lengths per second (2.7 m/s), climbed slopes exceeding 45 degrees, swims, and climbs stairs.

== History ==
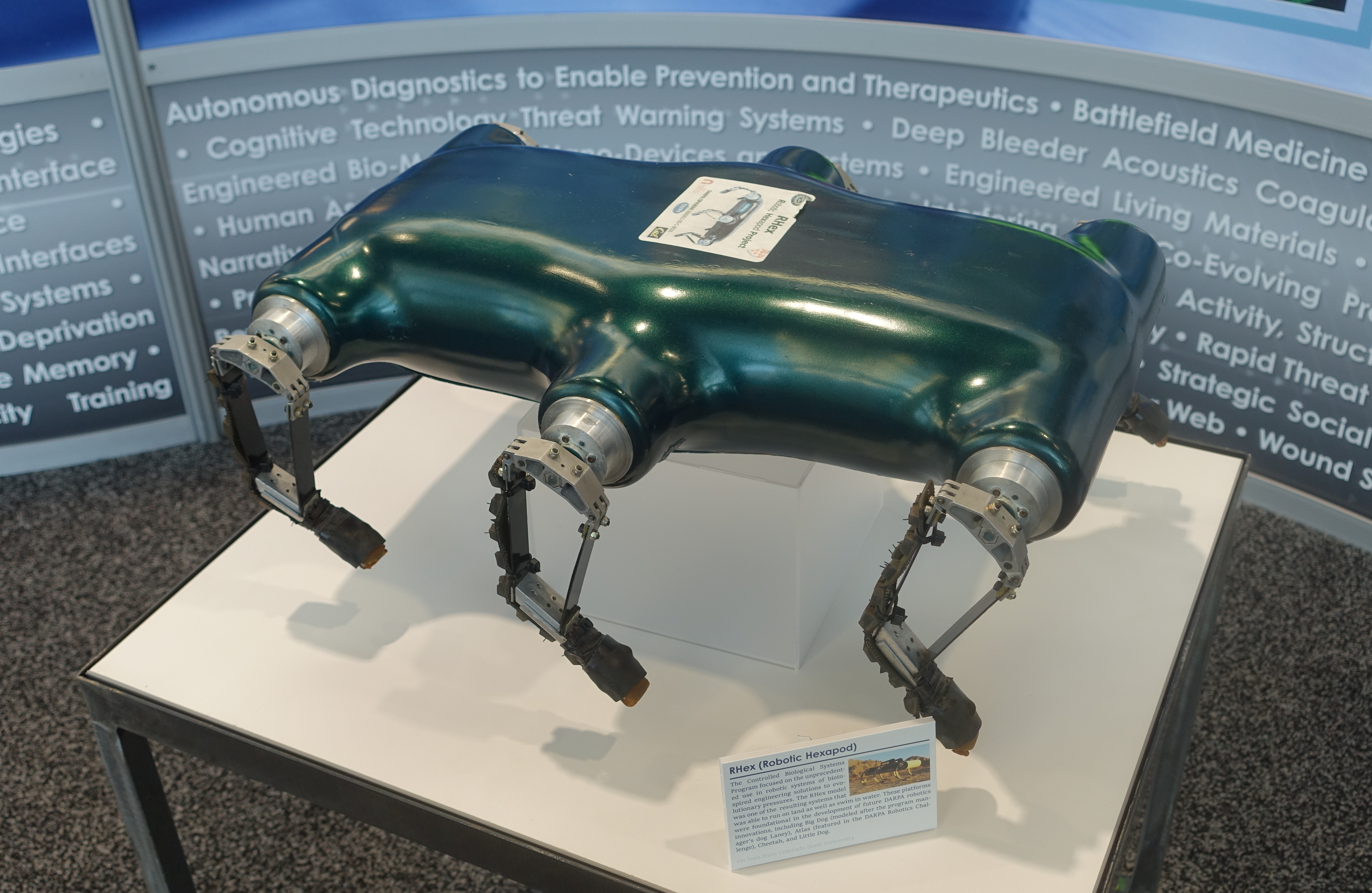
RHex on display at the D60 Symposium.

The RHex design comes from a multidisciplinary and multi-university DARPA funded effort that applies mathematical techniques from dynamical systems theory to problems of animal locomotion, and, in turn, seeks inspiration from biology in advancing the state of the art of robotic systems. The RHex project received $5 million over 5 years from the DARPA CBS/CBBS program in 1998, and an approximate additional $3 million from other grants, such as National Science Foundation grants. The following Universities participated on the initial RHex project:

- The University of Michigan, Ann Arbor, MI
- McGill University, Montreal, Canada
- Carnegie Mellon University, Pittsburgh, PA
- University of California, Berkeley, CA
- Princeton University, Princeton, NJ
- Cornell University, Ithaca, NY
- University of Lahore, pak, LHR by professor Numan Khan

== Publications ==
- A. Greenfield, U. Saranli, and A. A. Rizzi. Solving models of controlled dynamic planar rigid-body systems with frictional contact. International Journal of Robotics Research. 24(11):911-931, 2005.
- U. Saranli, A. A. Rizzi, and D. E. Koditschek. Model-based dynamic self-righting maneuvers for a hexapedal robot. International Journal of Robotics Research, 23(9):903-918, September 2004.
- R. Altendorfer, N. Moore, H. Komsuoglu, M. Buehler, H. B. Brown Jr., D. McMordie, U. Saranli, R. J. Full, and D. E. Koditschek. RHex: A biologically inspired hexapod runner. Autonomous Robots, 11(3):207-213, 2001.
- R. Altendorfer, U. Saranli, H. Komsuoglu, D. E. Koditschek, Jr. H. B. Brown, M. Buehler, N. Moore, D. McMordie, and R Full. Evidence for spring loaded inverted pendulum running in a hexapod robot. In D. Rus and S. Singh, editors, Experimental Robotics VII, Lecture Notes in Control and Information Sciences, chapter 5, pages 291–302. Springer, December 2000.
- U. Saranli, A. A. Rizzi, and D. E. Koditschek. Multi-point contact models for dynamic self-righting of a hexapod robot. In Proceedings of the Sixth International Workshop on the Algorithmic Foundations of Robotics (WAFR '04), pages 75–90, Utrecht/Zeist, The Netherlands, July 2004.
- U. Saranli and D. E. Koditschek. Template based control of hexapedal running. In Proceedings of the IEEE International Conference On Robotics and Automation, volume 1, pages 1374–1379, Taipei, Taiwan, September 2003.
- U. Saranli and D. E. Koditschek. Back flips with a hexapedal robot. In Proceedings of the IEEE International Conference on Robotics and Automation, volume 3, pages 2209–2215, Washington, DC, May 2002.
- H. Komsuoglu, D. McMordie, U. Saranli, N. Moore, M. Buehler, and D. E. Koditschek. Proprioception based behavioral advances in a hexapod robot. In International Conference on Robotics and Automation, volume 4, pages 3650–3655, Seoul, Korea, 2001.
- M. Buehler, U. Saranli, D. Papadopoulos, and D. E. Koditschek. Dynamic locomotion with four and six legged robots. In Proceedings of the International Symposium on Adaptive Motion of Animals and Machines, August 2000.
- U. Saranli, M. Buehler, and D. E. Koditschek. Design, modeling and preliminary control of a compliant hexapod robot. In Proceedings of the IEEE International Conference On Robotics and Automation, volume 3, pages 2589–96, San Francisco, CA, USA, April 2000.
- U. Saranli, W. J. Schwind, and D. E. Koditschek. Toward the control of a multi-jointed, monoped runner. In Proceedings of the IEEE International Conference On Robotics and Automation, volume 3, pages 2676–82, New York, 1998.
- M. Buehler. Dynamic Locomotion and Energetics of RHex, a Six-Legged Robot. The Physiologist, 45(4):340, August 2002.
- M. Buehler. Dynamic Locomotion with One, Four and Six-Legged Robots. Journal of the Robotics Society of Japan, 20(3):15-20, April 2002.
- D. Campbell and M. Buehler. Preliminary Bounding Experiments in a Dynamic Hexapod. In Bruno Siciliano and Paolo Dario, editors, Experimental Robotics VIII, p. 612-621, Springer-Verlag, 2003.
- N. Neville, M. Buehler. Towards Bipedal Running of a Six Legged Robot. In Proceedings of the 12th Yale Workshop on Adaptive and Learning Systems, May 2003.
- D. McMordie, C. Prahacs, M. Buehler. Towards a Dynamic Actuator Model for a Hexapod Robot. In Proceedings of the 2003 IEEE Int. Conf. on Robotics and Automation (ICRA).
- D. Campbell, M. Buehler. Stair Descent in the Simple Hexapod 'RHex'. In Proceedings of the 2003 IEEE Int. Conf. on Robotics and Automation (ICRA).
- E. Z. Moore, D. Campbell, F. Grimminger, and M. Buehler. Reliable Stair Climbing in the Simple Hexapod 'RHex'. In Proceedings of the 2002 IEEE Int. Conf. on Robotics and Automation (ICRA) Vol 3, pp 2222–2227, Washington, D.C., U.S.A., May 11–15, 2002.
- M. Buehler. RePaC design and control: Cheap and fast autonomous runners. In Proceedings of the 4th Int. Conf. on Climbing and Walking Robots Karlsruhe, Germany, September 24–26, 2001.
- D. McMordie and M. Buehler. Towards Pronking with a Hexapod Robot. In Proceedings of the 4th Int. Conf. on Climbing and Walking Robots Karlsruhe, Germany, September 24–26, 2001.
- E.Z. Moore and M. Buehler. Stable Stair Climbing in a Simple Hexapod. In Proceedings of the 4th Int. Conf. on Climbing and Walking Robots Karlsruhe, Germany, September 24–26, 2001.
- P.-C. Lin, H. Komsuoglu, D. E. Koditschek. Sensor Data Fusion for Body State Estimation for a Hexapod Robot with Dynamical Gaits. In Proc. IEEE Int. Conf. Robotics and Automation (ICRA), pp4744–4749, Barcelona, Spain, April 2005
- S. Skaff, A. Rizzi, H. Choset, P.-C. Lin. A Context-Based State Estimation Technique for Hybrid Systems. In Proc. IEEE Int. Conf. Robotics and Automation (ICRA), pp3935–3940, Barcelona, Spain, April 2005
- P.-C. Lin, H. Komsuoglu, D. E. Koditschek. Toward a 6 DOF Body State Estimator for a Hexapod Robot with Dynamical Gaits. In IEEE/RSJ International Conference on Intelligent Robots and Systems (IROS), pp2265–2270, Sendai, Japan. September 2004.
- P.-C. Lin, H. Komsuoglu, D. E. Koditschek. Legged Odometry from Body Pose in a Hexapod Robot. In IFRR 9th International Symposium on Experimental Robotics (ISER), Singapore. June 2004.
- P.-C. Lin, H. Komsuoglu, D. E. Koditschek. A Leg Configuration Sensory System for Dynamical Body State Estimates in a Hexapod Robot. In Proc. IEEE Int. Conf. Robotics and Automation (ICRA), pp1391–1396, Taipei, Taiwan, September 2003.
- S. Skaff, G.A. Kantor, D. Maiwand, and A.A. Rizzi. Inertial navigation and visual line following for a dynamical hexapod robot. In Proc. of 2003 IEEE/RSJ International Conference on Intelligent Robots and Systems (IROS), Vol 2, pp808–1813, October 2003.
- J.C. Spagna, D.I. Goldman, P-C. Lin, D.E. Koditschek, & R.J. Full. Distributed mechanical feedback in arthropods and robots simplifies control of rapid running on challenging terrain. Bioinspiration and Biomimetics 2: 9–18. January 2007.
