= Nitinol 60 =

High-durability nickel titanium alloy

NiTiNOL 60, or 60 NiTiNOL, is a Nickel Titanium alloy (nominally Ni-40wt% Ti) discovered in the late 1950s by the U. S. Naval Ordnance Laboratory (hence the "NOL" portion of the name NiTiNOL). Depending upon the heat treat history, 60 NiTiNOL has the ability to exhibit either superelastic properties in the hardened state or shape memory characteristics in the softened state.

Producing the material in any meaningful quantities, however, proved quite difficult by conventional methods and the material was largely forgotten.

The composition and processing parameters have recently been revived by Summit Materials, LLC under the trademarked name SM-100. SM-100 maintains 60 NiTiNOL's combination of superb corrosion resistance [NASA terms it "Corrosion Proof"] and equally impressive wear and erosion properties.

In bearing lifting tests conducted by NASA, SM-100 has been shown to have over twice the life of 440C stainless steel and over ten times the life of conventional titanium alloys with a significantly lower coefficient of friction. The superelastic nature of the material gives it the ability to withstand compression loading of well over 350 ksi (2,400 MPa) with no permanent yielding.

== Applications ==
Common applications for Nitinol 60 include:

- Bearings
- High-end knives
- High-end ice hockey skate blades
- Implantable medical devices, including collapsible braided structures and stents

== Properties ==
The following table compares 60 NiTiNOL against commonly used bearing materials.

	SM-100	440C	M-50
Density (g/cm^{3})	6.7	7.8	8.0
Hardness	58-64 Rc	58-62 Rc	60-65 Rc
Corrosion Resistance	Excellent	Marginal	Poor
Magnetic	Non	Mag.	Mag.
Modell Number	38	14	16
