= Magnetic shape-memory alloy =

A magnetic shape-memory alloy (MSMA) is a type of smart material that can undergo significant and reversible changes in shape in response to a magnetic field. This behavior arises due to a combination of magnetic and shape-memory properties within the alloy, allowing it to produce mechanical motion or force under magnetic actuation. MSMAs are commonly made from ferromagnetic materials, particularly nickel-manganese-gallium (Ni-Mn-Ga), and are useful in applications requiring rapid, controllable, and repeatable movement.

== Introduction ==
MSM alloys are ferromagnetic materials that can produce motion and forces under moderate magnetic fields. Typically, MSMAs are alloys of Nickel, Manganese and Gallium (Ni-Mn-Ga).

A magnetically induced deformation of about 0.2% was presented in 1996 by Dr. Kari Ullakko and co-workers at MIT. Since then, improvements on the production process and on the subsequent treatment of the alloys have led to deformations of up to 6% for commercially available single crystalline Ni-Mn-Ga MSM elements, as well as up to 10-12 % and 20% for new alloys in R&D stage.

The large magnetically induced strain, as well as the short response times make the MSM technology very attractive for the design of innovative actuators to be used in pneumatics, robotics, medical devices and mechatronics. MSM alloys change their magnetic properties depending on the deformation. This companion effect, which co-exist with the actuation, can be useful for the design of displacement, speed or force sensors and mechanical energy harvesters.

The magnetic shape memory effect occurs in the low temperature martensite phase of the alloy, where the elementary cells composing the alloy have tetragonal geometry. If the temperature is increased beyond the martensite–austenite transformation temperature, the alloy goes to the austenite phase where the elementary cells have cubic geometry. With such geometry the magnetic shape memory effect is lost.

The transition from martensite to austenite produces force and deformation. Therefore, MSM alloys can be also activated thermally, like thermal shape memory alloys (see, for instance, Nickel-Titanium (Ni-Ti) alloys).

== The magnetic shape memory effect ==
The mechanism responsible for the large strain of MSM alloys is the so-called magnetically induced reorientation (MIR), and is sketched in the figure. Like other ferromagnetic materials, MSM alloys exhibit a macroscopic magnetization when subjected to an external magnetic field, emerging from the alignment of elementary magnetizations along the field direction. However, differently from standard ferromagnetic materials, the alignment is obtained by the geometric rotation of the elementary cells composing the alloy, and not by rotation of the magnetization vectors within the cells (like in magnetostriction).

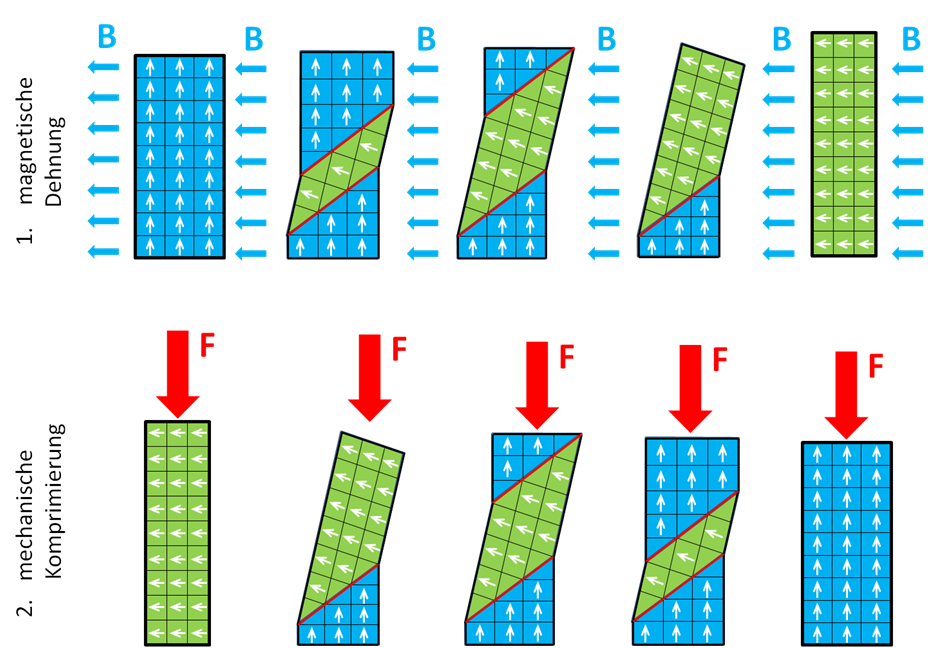
Magnetic shape memory working principle. Note that the deformation kink shown in the figure is only for illustration purposes, while in actual materials the kink is < 4 °.

A similar phenomenon occurs when the alloy is subjected to an external force. Macroscopically, the force acts like the magnetic field, favoring the rotation of the elementary cells and achieving elongation or contraction depending on its application within the reference coordinate system. The elongation and contraction processes are shown in the figure where, for example, the elongation is achieved magnetically and the contraction mechanically.

The rotation of the cells is a consequence of the large magnetic anisotropy of MSM alloys, and the high mobility of the internal regions. Simply speaking, an MSM element is composed by internal regions, each having a different orientation of the elementary cells (the regions are shown by the figure in green and blue colors). These regions are called twin-variants. The application of a magnetic field or of an external stress shifts the boundaries of the variants, called twin boundaries, and thus favors one variant or the other. When the element is completely contracted or completely elongated, it is formed by only one variant and it is said to be in a single variant state. The magnetization of the MSM element along a fixed direction differs if the element is in the contraction or in the elongation single variant state. The magnetic anisotropy is the difference between the energy required to magnetize the element in contraction single variant state and in elongation single variant state. The value of the anisotropy is related to the maximum work-output of the MSM alloy, and thus to the available strain and force that can be used for applications.

== Properties ==
The main properties of the MSM effect for commercially available elements are summarized in (where other aspects of the technology and of the related applications are described):

- Strain up to 6%
- Max. generated stress up to 3 MPa
- Minimum magnetic field for maximum strain: 500 kA/m
- Full strain (6%) up to 2 MPa load
- Workoutput per unit volume of about 150 kJ/m^3
- Energetic efficiency (conversion between input magnetic energy and output mechanical work) about 90%
- Internal friction stress of around 0.5 MPa
- Magnetic and thermal activation
- Operating temperatures between -40 and 60 °C
- Change in magnetic permeability and electric resistivity during deformation

=== Fatigue Properties ===
The fatigue life of MSMAs is of particular interest for actuation applications due to the high frequency cycling, so improving the microstructure of these alloys has been of particular interest. Researchers have improved the fatigue life up to 2 billion cycles with a maximum stress of 2MPa, providing promising data to support real application of MSMAs in devices. Although high fatigue life has been demonstrated, this property has been found to be controlled by the internal twinning stress in the material, which is dependent on the crystal structure and twin boundaries. Additionally, inducing a fully strained (elongated or contracted) MSMA has been found to reduce fatigue life, so this must be taken into consideration when designing functional MSMA systems. In general, reducing defects such as surface roughness that cause stress concentration can increase the fatigue life and fracture resistance of MSMAs.

== Development of the alloys ==
Standard alloys are Nickel-Manganese-Gallium (Ni-Mn-Ga) alloys, which are investigated since the first relevant MSM effect has been published in 1996. Other alloys under investigation are Iron-Palladium (Fe-Pd) alloys, Nickel-Iron-Gallium (Ni-Fe-Ga) alloys, and several derivates of the basic Ni-Mn-Ga alloy which further contain Iron (Fe), Cobalt (Co) or Copper (Cu). The main motivation behind the continuous development and testing of new alloys is to achieve improved thermo-magneto-mechanical properties, such as a lower internal friction, a higher transformation temperature and a higher Curie temperature, which would allow the use of MSM alloys in several applications. In fact, the actual temperature range of standard alloys is up to 50 °C. Recently, an 80 °C alloy has been presented.

Due to the twin boundary motion mechanism required for the magnetic shape memory effect to occur, the highest performing MSMAs in terms of maximum induced strain have been single crystals. Additive manufacturing has been demonstrated as a technique to produce porous polycrystalline MSMAs. As opposed to fully dense polycrystalline MSMAs, porous structures allow more freedom of motion, which reduces the internal stress required to activate martensitic twin boundary motion. Additionally, post-process heat treatments such as sintering and annealing have been found to significantly increase the hardness and reduce the elastic moduli of Ni-Mn-Ga alloys.

== Applications ==
MSM actuator elements can be used where fast and precise motion is required. They are of interest due to the faster actuation using magnetic field as compared to the heating/cooling cycles required for conventional shape memory alloys, which also promises higher fatigue lifetime. Possible application fields are robotics, manufacturing, medical surgery, valves, dampers, sorting. MSMAs have been of particular interest in the application of actuators (i.e. microfluidic pumps for lab-on-a-chip devices) since they are capable of large force and stroke outputs in relatively small spatial regions. Also, due to the high fatigue life and their ability to produce electromotive forces from a magnetic flux, MSMAs are of interest in energy harvesting applications. In the biomedical field, MSMA applications include self-expanding stents, active catheters, wireless tools, endoscopes, and cardiac devices.

The twinning stress, or internal frictional stress, of an MSMA determines the efficiency of actuation, so the operation design of MSM actuators is based on the mechanical and magnetic properties of a given alloy; for example, the magnetic permeability of an MSMA is a function of strain. The most common MSM actuator design consists of an MSM element controlled by permanent magnets producing a rotating magnetic field and a spring restoring a mechanical force during the shape memory cycling. Limitations on the magnetic shape memory effect due to crystal defects determine the efficiency of MSMAs in applications. Since the MSM effect is also temperature dependent, these alloys can be tailored to shift the transition temperature by controlling microstructure and composition.
