= Frederick E. Wang =

Taiwanese-American Solid State Chemist

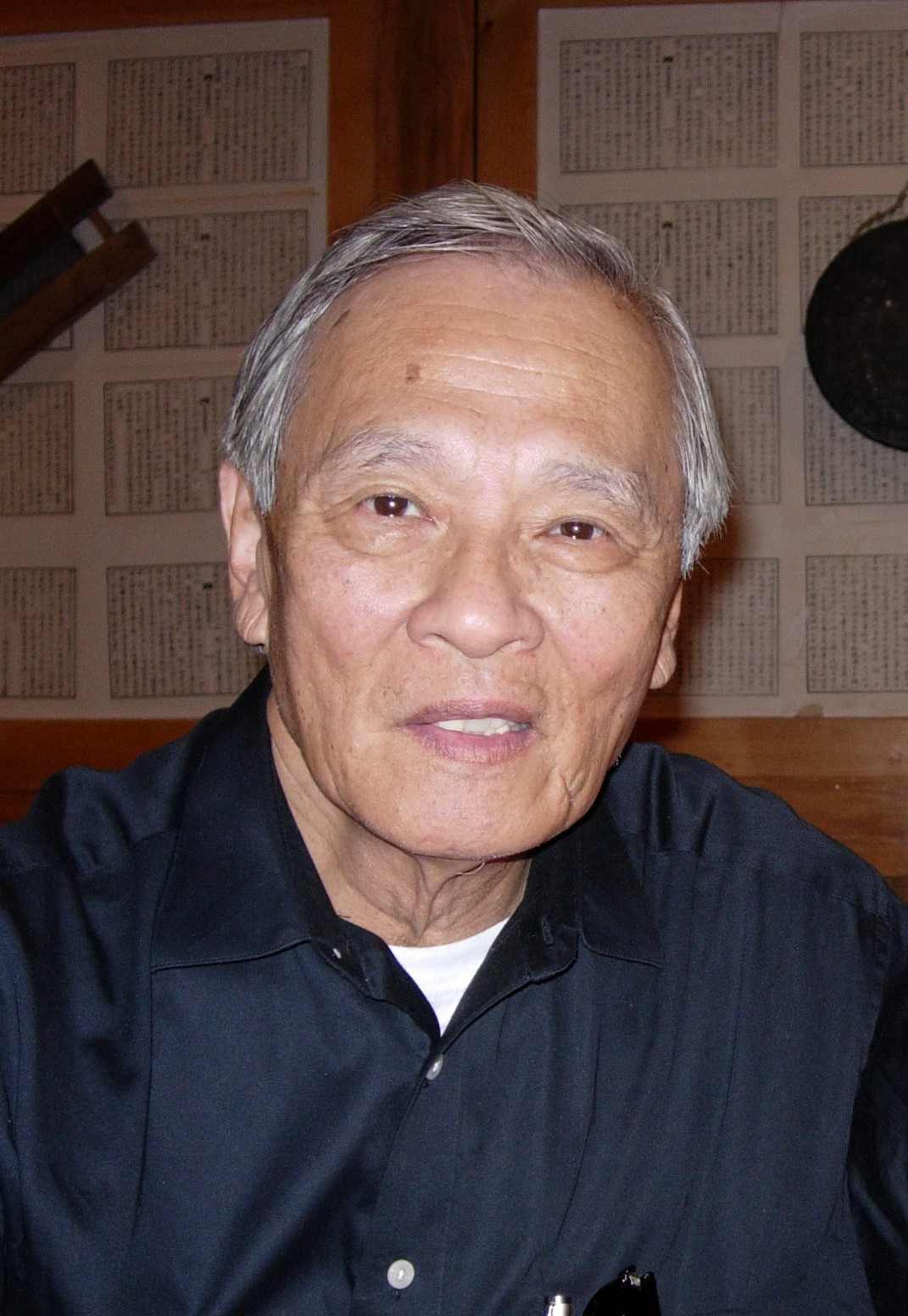
- Born: Wang En-Yu; August 1, 1932; Shetou, Taiwan
- Died: January 3, 2022 (aged 89)
- Education: Syracuse University
- Children: 2
- Scientific career
- Workplaces: Innovative Technologies International, Inc. Naval Ordnance Laboratory; Harvard University; Syracuse University

Frederick En-Yu Wang (August 1, 1932 – January 3, 2022) was a Taiwanese-American solid state chemist. He determined the crystal structure of Nitinol and the development and patenting of thermal heat exchange engines using Nitinol. He was the founder of Innovative Technology International (1980).

== Early life ==
Wang, born in Taiwan, was the second son of Eng-Siek Wang and Sim-Chu Wu.

Wang married Mary Jo Walker in 1962. Together, they had two children, Fritz Wang and Teresa Wang. Walker and Wang divorced in 1989.

== Education ==
Wang studied at the Southwestern University, where he graduated in 1953 with a Bachelors of Science in Physical Science. He attained a Master's of Science in Physical Science (University of Illinois Urbana-Champaign) in 1957, and PhD in Solid State Chemistry (Syracuse University) in 1960. Wang did post-doctoral work at Harvard University between 1960 and 1962, where he researched and studied boron hydrides under Nobel laureate, William Lipscomb.

== Research and discoveries ==
During his work at Harvard from 1960 to 1962, assisted with Lipscomb's Nobel Prize winning borane research and co-authored several research papers with Lipscomb.

From 1963 to 1980, Wang worked at the Naval Ordinance Laboratory (NOL) in White Oak, Maryland. While working with William Buehler at NOL, Wang determined the crystal structure of a shape memory alloy (SMA) called Nitinol, which Buehler discovered earlier.

Wang's ongoing research at NOL resulted in various patents relating to Nitinol, SMAs, and Li-B compounds.

In 1980, Wang started his own company, Innovative Technology International, Inc. (ITI), and embarked on developing and patenting a thermal heat exchange engine using Nitinol.

While running ITI, Wang continued to collaborate with other scientists to publish articles on superconductivity.

== Later life ==
After retiring from ITI in 2012, Wang returned to Taiwan, working as a consultant until 2017.

== Death ==
Wang died on January 3, 2022, in High Point, NC.

== Publications ==
Grimes, R., Wang, F. E., Lewin, R., & Lipscomb, W. N. (1961). A New Type of Boron Hydride, B10H16. Proceedings of the National Academy of Sciences, 47(7), 996-999.

Wang, F. E., Buehler, W. J., & Pickart, S. J. (1965). Crystal Structure and a Unique``Martensitic''Transition of TiNi. Journal of Applied Physics, 36(10), 3232-3239.

Wang, F. E., DeSavage, B. F., Buehler, W. J., & Hosler, W. R. (1968). The irreversible critical range in the TiNi transition. Journal of Applied Physics, 39(5), 2166-2175.

Buehler, W. J., & Wang, F. E. (1968). A summary of recent research on the nitinol alloys and their potential application in ocean engineering. Ocean Engineering, 1(1), 105-120.

Wang, F. E., Pickart, S. J., & Alperin, H. A. (1972). Mechanism of the TiNi Martensitic Transformation and the Crystal Structures of TiNi‐II and TiNi‐III Phases. Journal of Applied Physics, 43(1), 97-112.

Wang, F. E., & Buehler, W. J. (1972). Additional unique property changes observed during TiNi transition. Applied Physics Letters, 21(3), 105-106.

Wang, F. E. (1979). An unusual phenomenon in the formation of Li 5 B 4 compound-alloy. Metallurgical Transactions A, 10, 343-348.

Wang, F. E. (2018). Bonding theory for metals and alloys. Elsevier.
