= Spangold =

Family of alloys

Spangold is a family of shape memory-effect alloys (SME) of gold, copper, and aluminum in either 18K or 23K. The name of the family is a play on the word "spangled".

Spangold is a beta-phase alloy with a nominal stoichiometry of Au_{7}Cu_{5}Al_{4} and a nominal composition by mass of 76% gold, 18% copper, and 6% aluminum. The texture is caused by the induction of a martensitic-type phase transformation on a polished surface.

Spangold undergoes a martensitic-type phase transformation when properly treated. This phase transformation is induced on a polished surface of the alloy. Martensitic transformations are a common feature in shape memory alloys, and they involve a reversible change in crystal structure that allows the material to recover its original shape when subjected to specific temperature changes.
