= George Andreasen =

American inventor

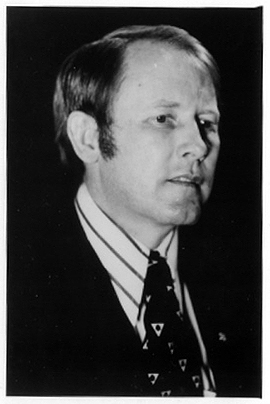
- Born: February 16, 1934; Fremont, Nebraska, United States
- Died: August 11, 1989 (aged 55)
- Education: Oxford University, University of Nebraska
- Known for: Nitinol
- Children: Suz Andreasen, Robin O. Andreasen

George F. Andreasen (February 16, 1934 – August 11, 1989), born in Fremont, Nebraska, was an American orthodontist and inventor.

Andreasen, most noted for his invention and patent of the Nitinol Wire, also known as Memory Wire or shape memory alloy, began his experimentation with the nickel-titanium (NiTi) alloys as early as 1969. His idea for Nitinol came from an article he read in the United States Naval laboratory publication supplement in the Journal of American Orthodontics. Over the course of the next seven years, Andreasen experimented with his formula until he reached his goal and was awarded U.S. Pat. No. 4,037,324 on July 26, 1979. To this day, this is the highest earning patent fostered by the University of Iowa College of Orthodontics.

Andreasen joined the University of Iowa Orthodontics department in 1963 and was chairman of the orthodontics department from 1965 to 1975. He held degrees in mechanical engineering and in dentistry from Oxford University and the University of Nebraska. He was a diplomate of the American Board of Orthodontics. Dr. Andreasen died on August 11, 1989, of multiple myeloma at the age of 55.

In recognition of Dr. Andreasen's significant contributions to the field of orthodontics and thanks to generous contributions by alumni and other supporters, the Department of Orthodontics at the University of Iowa has established a Dr. George Andreasen Memorial fund to support orthodontic resident research projects.

== See also ==
- Nickel-Titanium Alloys
- "George Andreasen, 55, Orthodontics Inventor". The New York Times. August 15, 1989.
