= Shrink-fitting =

Form of fastening

Shrink-fitting is a technique in which an interference fit is achieved by a relative size change after assembly. This is usually achieved by heating or cooling one component before assembly and allowing it to return to the ambient temperature after assembly, employing the phenomenon of thermal expansion to make a joint. For example, the thermal expansion of a piece of a metallic drainpipe allows a builder to fit the cooler piece to it. As the adjoined pieces reach the same temperature, the joint becomes strained and stronger.

Other examples are the fitting of a wrought iron tyre around the rim of a wooden cart wheel by a wheelwright, or of a steel tyre to the wheel of a railway engine or rolling stock. In both cases the tyre will be heated and expands to slightly greater than the wheel's diameter, and is fitted around it. After cooling, the tyre contracts, binding tightly in place. The bombard Mons Meg was assembled from longitudinal staves of iron held in place by shrink-fitted iron hoops.

A common method used in industry is the use of induction shrink fitting which refers to the use of induction heating technology to pre-heat metal components between 150˚C and 300˚C thereby causing them to expand and allow for the insertion or removal of another component. Other methods of shrink-fitting include compression shrink fitting, which uses a cryogen such as liquid nitrogen to cool the insert, and shape memory coupling, which is achieved by means of a phase transition.
