= Harmeet =

Harmeet is an Indian name. It may refer to

- Harmeet Desai, Indian table-tennis player
- Harmeet Dhillon, American lawyer and politician
- Harmeet Singh Baddhan, Indian cricketer
- Harmeet Singh Bansal, Indian cricketer
- Harmeet Singh (cricketer born 1987), Indian cricketer
- Harmeet Singh (cricketer born 1992), Indian cricketer
- Harmeet Singh (footballer) (born 1990), Norwegian footballer
- Harmeet Singh Kalka, Indian politician
- Harmeet Singh Sooden, Canadian and New Zealand citizen who volunteered for Christian Peacemaker Teams in Iraq
- Harmeet D. Walia, American inventor
- Harmeet Singh (militant), 8th Chief of Khalistan Liberation Force, a separatist organization in India
