= Shape-memory coupling =

Pipe connection process

Shape-memory coupling is a system for connecting pipes using shape-memory alloys. In its typical form the technique uses an internally ribbed sleeve of alloy such as Tinel(see Nitinol) that is slightly smaller in diameter than the pipes it is to connect. The sleeve is cooled in liquid nitrogen then, in this low-temperature state, mechanically expanded with a mandrel to fit easily over the two pipe ends to be joined. After fitting, it is allowed to rewarm, when the memory effect causes the sleeve to shrink back to its original smaller size, creating a tight joint.

It was first produced in the late 1960s or early 1970s by the Raychem Corporation under the trade name CryoFit. Manufacture of these couplings for aerospace hydraulic connections was later transferred to AMCI (Advanced Metal Components Inc.) and then later to Aerofit Products Inc. Additional products using the same shape-memory alloy technology are produced under Cryolive and CryoFlare trade names.
