= Harmeet D. Walia =

American endodontist and inventor

Harmeet D. Walia (April 15, 1957 – October 17, 2018) was an American endodontist and inventor. He introduced the use of nickel titanium shape memory alloy for the manufacture of root canal files, which had traditionally been made of carbon or stainless steel.

Walia received the prestigious Ralph F. Sommer Award in recognition for his work from the American Association of Endodontists in 2005.
