= Nickel titanium =

Alloy known for shape-memory effect

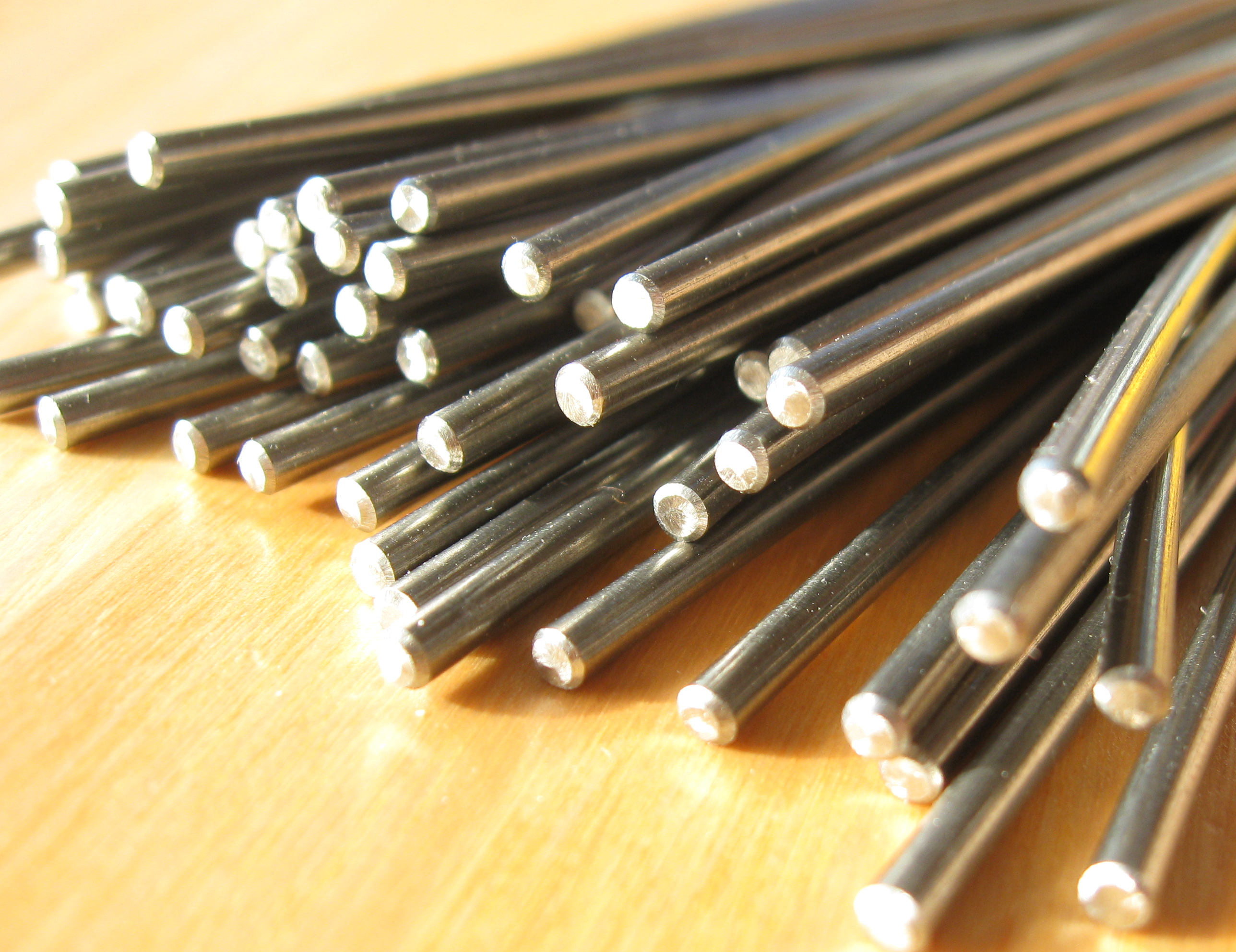
- Nitinol wires

Material properties
- Melting point: 1,310 °C (2,390 °F)
- Density: 6.45 g/cm^{3} (0.233 lb/cu in)
- Electrical resistivity (austenite): 82×10^{−6} Ω·cm
- (martensite): 76×10^{−6} Ω·cm
- Thermal conductivity (austenite): 0.18 W/cm·K
- (martensite): 0.086 W/cm·K
- Coefficient of thermal expansion (austenite): 11×10^{−6}/°C
- (martensite): 6.6×10^{−6}/°C
- Magnetic permeability: < 1.002
- Magnetic susceptibility (austenite): 3.7×10^{−6} emu/g
- (martensite): 2.4×10^{−6} emu/g
- Elastic modulus (austenite): 75–83 GPa (10.9×10^{6}–12.0×10^{6} psi)
- (martensite): 28–40 GPa (4.1×10^{6}–5.8×10^{6} psi)
- Yield strength (austenite): 195–690 MPa (28.3–100.1 ksi)
- (martensite): 70–140 MPa (10–20 ksi)
- Poisson's ratio: 0.33
- Nitinol properties are particular to the precise composition of the alloy and its processing. These specifications are typical for commercially available shape memory nitinol alloys

Nickel titanium, also known as nitinol, is a metal alloy of nickel and titanium whose two elements are present in roughly equal atomic percentages. Nitinol alloys are named according to the weight percentage of nickel; e.g., nitinol 55 and nitinol 60.

Nitinol alloys exhibit two related and unique properties: the shape memory effect and superelasticity (also called pseudoelasticity). Shape memory is the ability of nitinol to undergo deformation at one temperature, stay in its deformed shape when the external force is removed, then recover its original, undeformed shape upon heating above its transformation temperature. Superelasticity is the ability of a material to undergo large deformations under external load and, upon removal of the load, immediately return to its undeformed shape. Nitinol can undergo elastic deformations 10 to 30 times larger than alternative metals. Whether nitinol behaves with shape memory effect or superelasticity depends on whether it is above its transformation temperature during the action. Nitinol displays the shape memory effect when it is colder than its transformation temperature and superelasticity when warmer.

Nitinol is derived from the names of the component metals of nitinol and of its place of discovery: nickel (Ni), titanium (Ti), and Naval Ordnance Laboratory (NOL).

== History ==
The shape-memory effect was discovered in 1932, when Swedish chemist Arne Ölander observed the property in gold–cadmium alloys. The same effect was observed in Cu–Zn (brass) in the early 1950s.

In the 1950s, William J. Buehler was tasked with finding alloys with high resistance to fatigue under high temperatures to be used in missile nose cones at the Naval Ordnance Laboratory in 1959.

In 1961, they presented a sample at a laboratory management meeting. The sample, folded up like an accordion, was passed around and flexed by the participants. One of them applied heat from his pipe lighter to the sample and the accordion-shaped strip contracted and retook its previous shape.

One year later, the Naval Ordinance Lab announced the successful creation of nitinol. In 1962, Frederick E. Wang joined the team at NOL and discovered the crystal structure responsible for nitinol's properties.

While potential applications for nitinol were realized immediately, practical efforts to commercialize the alloy took place in the 1980s, largely due to the difficulty of melting, processing and machining the alloy.

== Mechanism ==
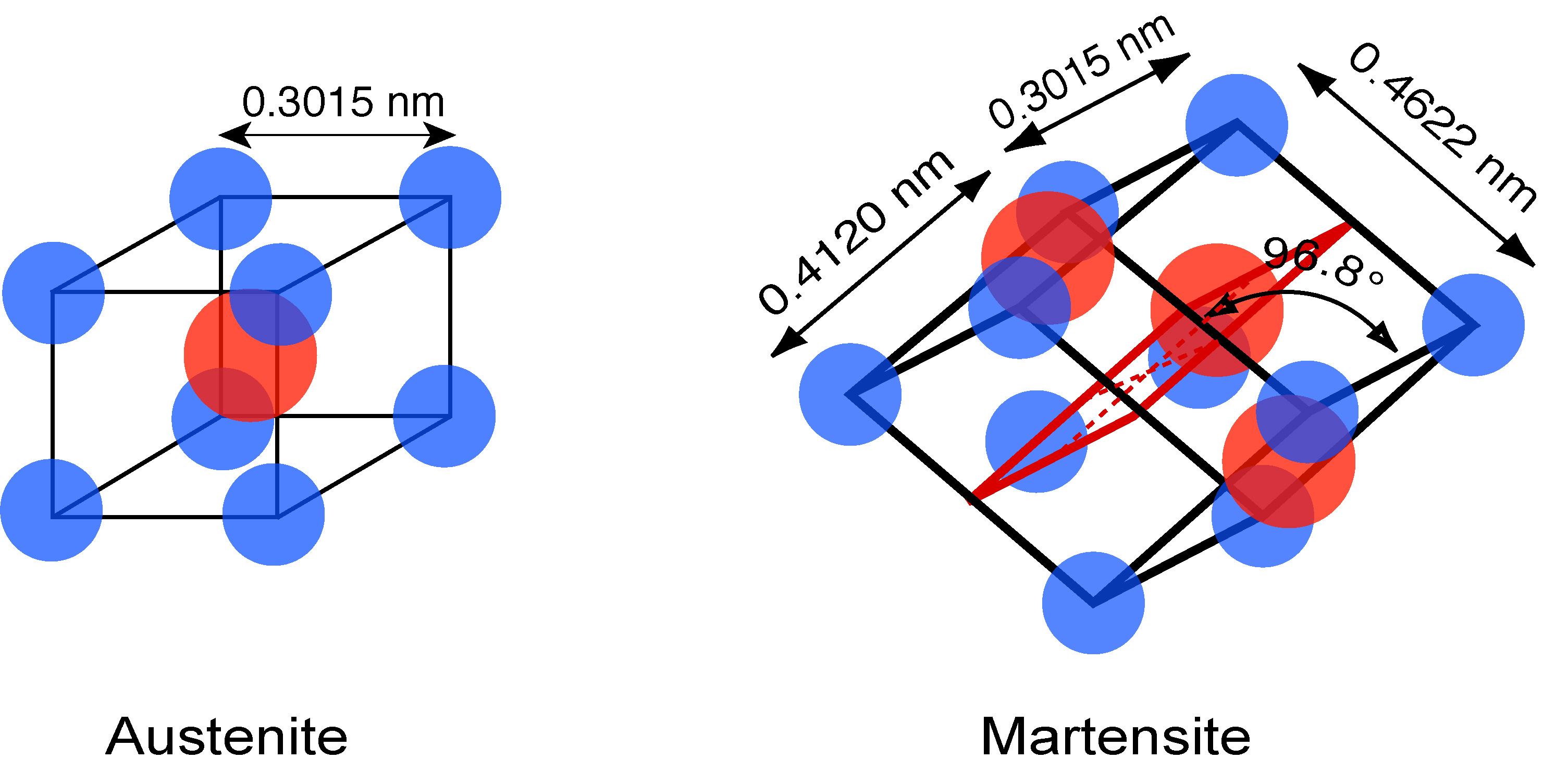
3D view of austenite and martensite structures of the NiTi compound

Nitinol's unusual properties are derived from martensitic transformation, a reversible solid-state phase transformation between two different martensite crystal phases, requiring 70–140 MPa (10,000–20,000 psi) of mechanical stress.

At high temperatures nitinol assumes an interpenetrating cubic structure, known as the parent phase; such a material is referred to as austenite. At low temperatures nitinol spontaneously transforms to a more complicated monoclinic crystal structure, the daughter phase; material in this state is known as martensite. Four temperatures are associated to the austenite-to-martensite and martensite-to-austenite transformations. Starting from full austenite, martensite begins to form as the alloy cools to the martensite start temperature, or M_{s}. The temperature at which the transformation is complete is the martensite finish temperature, or M_{f}. When the alloy is fully martensite and is subjected to heating, austenite starts to form at the austenite start temperature, A_{s}, and finishes at the austenite finish temperature, A_{f}.

Thermal hysteresis of nitinol's phase transformation

The cooling/heating cycle displays thermal hysteresis. The hysteresis width depends on the precise nitinol composition and processing. Its typical value requires a temperature range spanning about 20–50 °C (36–90 °F) that can be reduced or amplified by alloying and processing.

Crucial to nitinol properties are two key phase transformation aspects. First is that the transformation is reversible, meaning that heating above the transformation temperature reverts the crystal structure to the simpler austenite phase. Second, the transformation in both directions is instantaneous.

Martensite's crystal structure (known as a monoclinic, or B19′, structure) has the unique ability to undergo limited deformation in some ways without breaking atomic bonds. This type of deformation is known as twinning, consisting of the rearrangement of atomic planes without causing slip, or permanent deformation. It is able to undergo about 6–8% strain in this manner. When martensite reverts to austenite by heating, the original austenitic structure is restored regardless of whether the martensite phase was deformed, thus the shape of the high temperature austenite phase is "remembered" even though the alloy is deformed at a lower temperature.

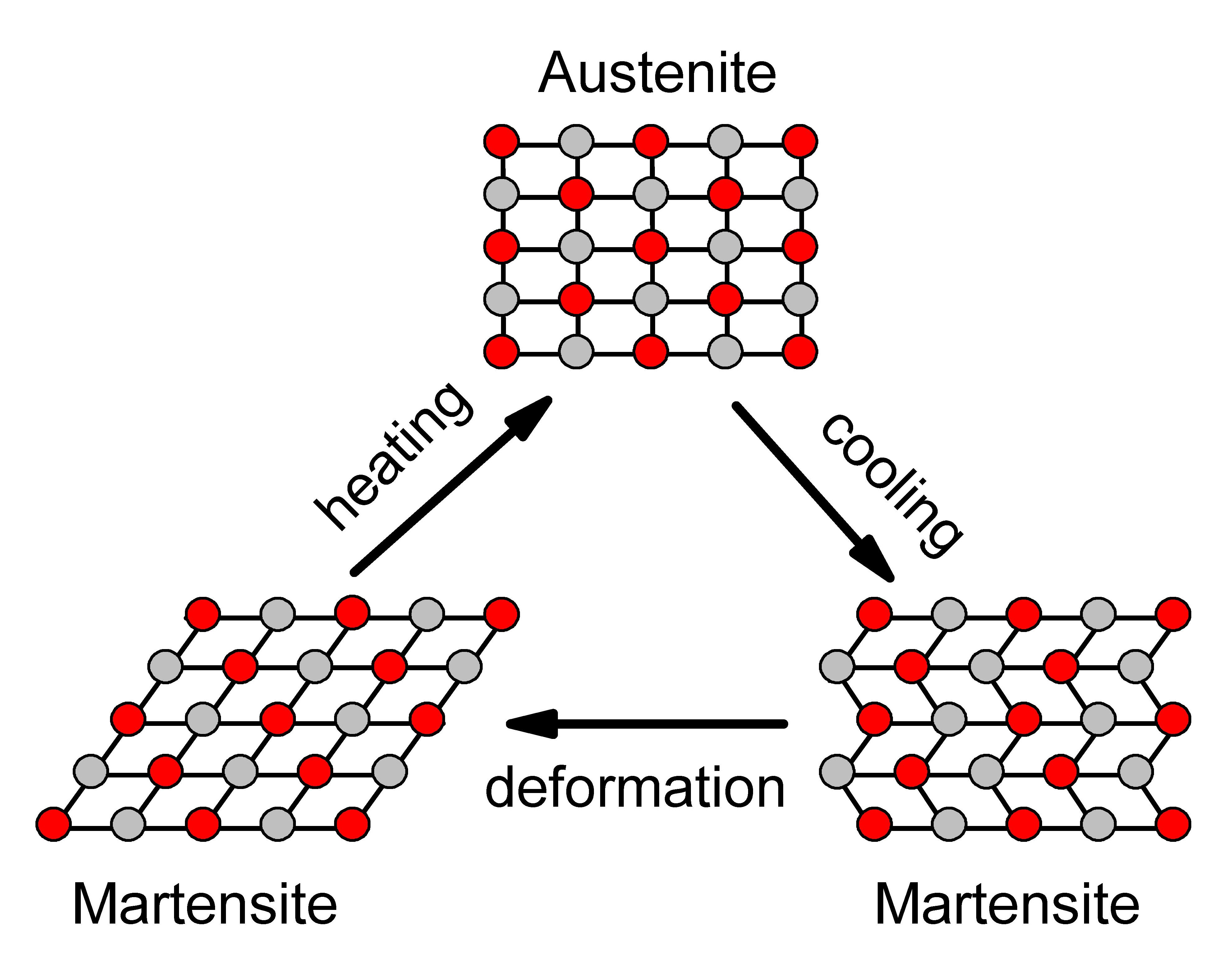
2D view of nitinol's crystalline structure during cooling/heating cycle

Pressure can be produced by preventing the reversion of deformed martensite to austenite—from 240 MPa (35,000 psi) to more than 690 MPa (100,000 psi). One reason that nitinol works so hard to return to its original shape is that it is an ordered intermetallic compound. In an ordinary alloy the constituents are randomly positioned in the crystal lattice; in an ordered intermetallic compound the atoms (in this case, nickel and titanium) occupy specific locations in the lattice. The fact that nitinol is an intermetallic is largely responsible for the complexity in fabricating devices made from the alloy.

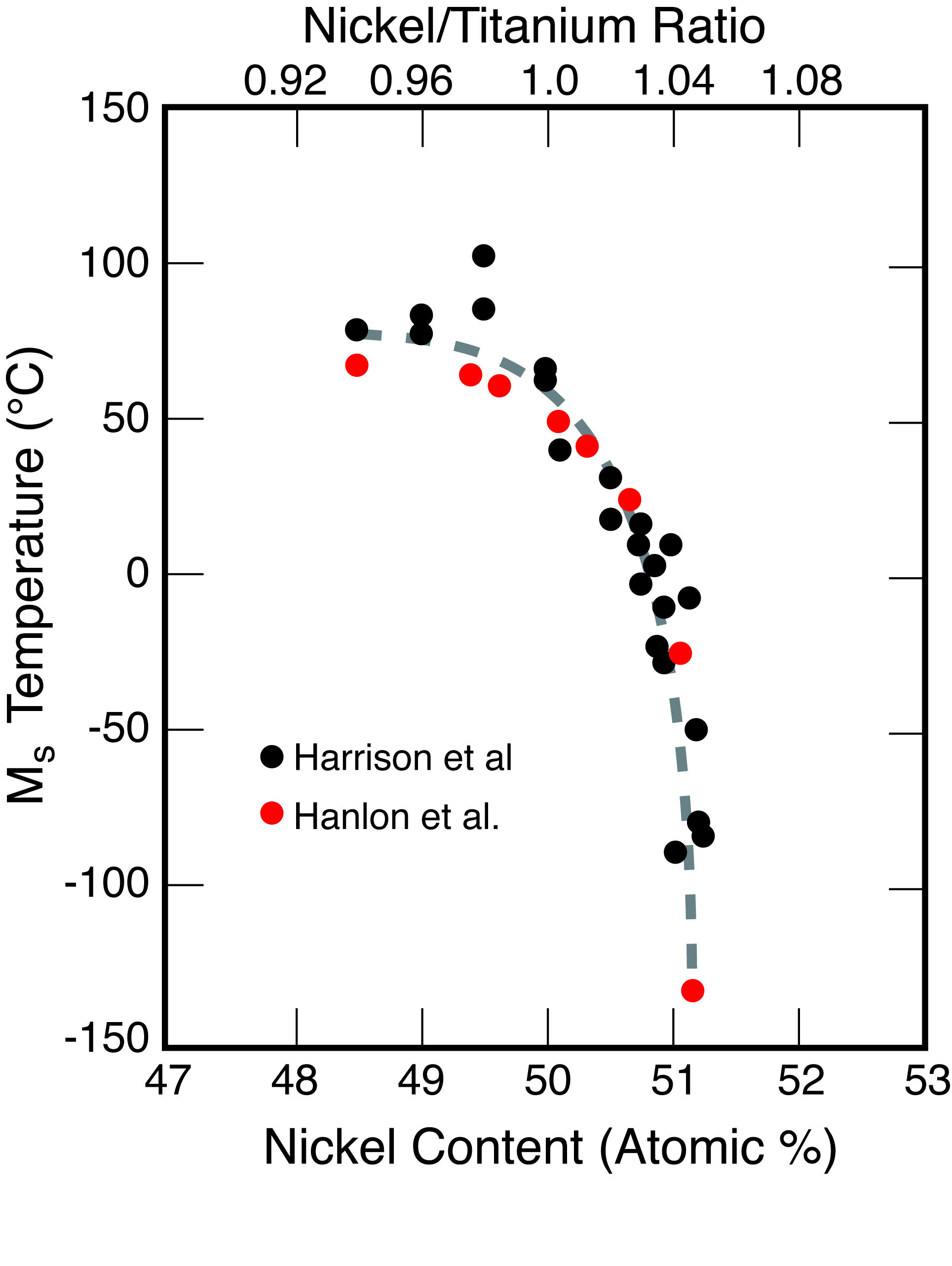
The effect of nitinol composition on the M_{s} temperature.

To fix the original "parent shape" the alloy must be held in position and heated to about 500 °C (930 °F). This process is usually called shape setting. A second effect, called superelasticity or pseudoelasticity, is also observed in nitinol. This effect is the direct result of the fact that martensite can be formed by applying a stress as well as by cooling. Thus in a certain temperature range, one can apply a stress to austenite, causing martensite to form while at the same time changing shape. In this case, as soon as the stress is removed, the nitinol will spontaneously return to its original shape. In this mode of use, nitinol behaves like a super spring, possessing an elastic range 10 to 30 times greater than that of a normal spring material. There are, however, constraints: the effect is only observed up to about 40 °C (72 °F) above the A_{f} temperature. This upper limit is referred to as M_{d}, corresponding to the highest temperature in which it is still possible to stress-induce the formation of martensite. Below M_{d}, martensite formation under load allows superelasticity due to twinning. Above M_{d}, since martensite is no longer formed, the only response to stress is slip of the austenitic microstructure, and thus permanent deformation.

Nitinol is typically composed of approximately 50 to 51% nickel by atomic percent (55 to 56% weight percent). Making small changes in the composition can change the transformation temperature of the alloy significantly. Transformation temperatures in nitinol can be controlled to some extent, where A_{f} temperature ranges from about −20 to +110 °C (−4 to 230 °F). Thus, it is common practice to refer to a nitinol formulation as superelastic or austenitic if A_{f} is lower than a reference temperature, and as shape memory or martensitic if higher. The reference temperature is usually defined as room temperature or human body temperature (37 °C or 99 °F).

One often-encountered effect regarding nitinol is the R-phase. The R-phase is another martensitic phase, which competes with the martensite phase mentioned above. Because it does not offer the large memory effects of the martensite phase, it is usually of no practical use.

== Manufacturing ==
Nitinol is exceedingly difficult to make due to the exceptionally tight compositional control required and the tremendous reactivity of titanium. Every atom of titanium that combines with oxygen or carbon is an atom that is robbed from the NiTi lattice, thus shifting the composition and making the transformation temperature lower.

There are two primary melting methods used. Vacuum arc remelting (VAR) is done by striking an electrical arc between the raw material and a water-cooled copper strike plate. Melting is done in a high vacuum, and the mold itself is water-cooled copper. Vacuum induction melting (VIM) is done by using alternating magnetic fields to heat the raw materials in a crucible (generally carbon). This is also done in a high vacuum. While both methods have advantages, it has been demonstrated that an industrial state-of-the-art VIM material has smaller inclusions than an industrial state-of-the-art VAR one, leading to a higher fatigue resistance. Other research reports that VAR employing extreme high-purity raw materials may lead to a reduced number of inclusions and thus to an improved fatigue behavior. Other methods are also used on a boutique scale, including plasma arc melting, induction skull melting, and e-beam melting. Physical vapour deposition is also used on a laboratory scale.

When melting nitinol (or any titanium alloy) by induction it is hard to find adequate material for crucibles. Molten titanium is chemically corrosive and requires extreme temperatures and specific conditions to avoid contamination. For example, if a granite crucible is used, the carbon in granite can bind with titanium resulting in an impure alloy. Another thing to consider is erosion of the crucible walls. Factors that play into the amount of erosion include but are not limited to the movement of the molten nitinol, the crucible's porosity, and the time the molten metal is touching the material. The porosity of a crucible must be balanced so that the crucible has good temperature shock resistance and a short wetting distance so it does not erode. There are few materials for crucibles that work with titanium casting; this is a contributing factor to the difficulty in mass production of nitinol. Experiments are being done to use a coating over a crucible to block chemical interactions so that the base material only must be heat shock resistant and avoid erosion. For example, Y_{2}O_{3} is being researched as a coating in an aluminium oxide crucible. The Y_{2}O_{3} does not chemically interact with the titanium, and the aluminium oxide is heat shock resistant making a suitable combination.

Another method to manufacture nitinol that is less used is reactive sintering. Reactive sintering in a vacuum is used to compress nitinol powder into a shape. The powder is heated up to around about 580 and 650 °C via an exothermic chemical reaction and pressed into shape. This method produces a porous surface and because it is in a vacuum the titanium does not have the chance to bond to oxygen. However, the result is not necessarily homogeneous. It can form Ni_{3}Ti and Ti_{3}Ni due to the slow heating produced from the reaction. Heating it quickly can improve homogeneity and reduce the size of the pores. Spark plasma sintering was invented in 1980 as a method to make the heating as rapid as possible by sending an electric current through the system. This way the nitinol is purer without ni3ti or ti3ni forming.

Heat treating nitinol is delicate and critical. Aging time and temperature control the precipitation of various Ni-rich phases, and thus controls how much nickel resides in the NiTi lattice; by depleting the matrix of nickel, aging increases the transformation temperature. The combination of heat treatment and cold working is essential in controlling the properties of nitinol products. Nitinol that is made with a focus on shape memory effect is heat treated in a range of 350 to 450 °C. For superelastic Nitinol the temperature is closer to 500 °C. If the nickel component is greater than 55.5% then the heat treatment temperature is in the range of 600 to 900 °C

== Additive Manufacturing ==
Additive manufacturing methods of nitinol are being explored. Some examples include Selective Laser Melting, Selective Laser Sintering, and Laser Engineered Net Shaping. These methods produce varying results in surface quality, homogeneity, and density. They are all relatively expensive and take a long time to produce compared to conventional manufacturing methods but provide control over properties that other systems may not have.

Additive manufacturing allows for control over density and porosity. Porosity affects cell ingrowth and nickel ion release in implants. The more porous the material the more surface area for cells to bond to as well as the more surface contact with tissue for nickel to leach. Additionally, Elasticity is affected by how porous the result is, so additive manufacturing gives control over the elasticity of each layer. Different lattice shapes also provide different shape memory behavior. For example, a Schwartz structure provides more strength. While a diamond structure allows for better transformation strain.

Creating slicing software for additive manufacturing of a shape memory material like nitinol must include how it changes. Lexcellant and Boubon modeled the superelasticity of SMAs in one dimension.

== Challenges ==
Fatigue failures of nitinol devices are a constant subject of discussion. Because it is the material of choice for applications requiring enormous flexibility and motion (e.g., peripheral stents, heart valves, smart thermomechanical actuators and electromechanical microactuators), it is necessarily exposed to much greater fatigue strains compared to other metals. While the strain-controlled fatigue performance of nitinol is superior to all other known metals, fatigue failures have been observed in the most demanding applications. A great deal of effort is underway to better understand and define the durability limits of nitinol.

Nitinol is half nickel, and thus there has been a great deal of concern in the medical industry regarding the release of nickel, a known allergen and possible carcinogen. (Nickel is also present in substantial amounts in stainless steel and cobalt-chrome alloys also used in the medical industry.) During heat treating, nitinol forms a very stable protective TiO_{2} layer that acts as a barrier against ion exchange; repeatedly showing that nitinol releases nickel at a slower pace than stainless steel. Initially it was believed that a thicker oxide layer would keep more nickel from leaching into tissue, but it has since been proven to not be directly proportional. The thicker the oxide layer the more likely it is to form microcracks. These microcracks can cause the oxide layer to flake off as the nitinol deforms. Eventually these micro cracks can reach down to the pure nitinol layer and begin releasing nickel again. Additionally, when the oxide layer forms, the layer below becomes richer in nickel so if the oxide layer is compromised it will leach more nickel into nearby tissue. Thicker oxide layers are also more susceptible to low pH. When heat treated, the oxide layer that nitinol forms is black. This black oxide is thick, cracked, and prone to flaking. These cracks are made worse by pitting as anodes form along microcracks. Surface processing can make these cracks smaller and reduce pitting. After surface processing the oxide layer will become thinner and change color. The color can vary depending on the method. Examples include, but are not limited to blue, red, gold, and amber oxide layers. Surface processing methods can vary from mechanical to electrical and chemical polishing. Electrical and chemical polishing seem to be the most effective. In an experiment as reviewed by the following source, Electropolished wire was compared to untreated thick oxidized wire. It was found after 5000 cycles (deformations from shape memory) the thick oxide wire started to fracture, but the electropolished wire lasted 100,000 cycles. Because of this the process for creating an effective oxide layer is to polish (electro or chem) the nitinol before heat treating and then after heat treating until the oxide layer is acceptably thin.

There are constant and long-running discussions regarding inclusions in nitinol, both TiC and Ti_{2}NiO_{x}. As in all other metals and alloys, inclusions can be found in nitinol. The size, distribution and type of inclusions can be controlled to some extent. Theoretically, smaller, rounder, and fewer inclusions should lead to increased fatigue durability. In literature, some early works report to have failed to show measurable differences, while novel studies demonstrate a dependence of fatigue resistance on the typical inclusion size in an alloy.

Nitinol is difficult to weld, both to itself and other materials. Laser welding nitinol to itself is a relatively routine process. Strong joints between NiTi wires and stainless steel wires have been made using nickel filler. Laser and tungsten inert gas (TIG) welds have been made between NiTi tubes and stainless steel tubes. More research is ongoing into other processes and other metals to which nitinol can be welded.

Actuation frequency of nitinol is dependent on heat management, especially during the cooling phase. Numerous methods are used to increase the cooling performance, such as forced air, flowing liquids, thermoelectric modules (i.e. Peltier or semiconductor heat pumps), heat sinks, conductive materials and higher surface-to-volume ratio (improvements up to 3.3 Hz with very thin wires and up to 100 Hz with thin films of nitinol). The fastest nitinol actuation recorded was carried by a high voltage capacitor discharge which heated an SMA wire in a manner of microseconds, and resulted in a complete phase transformation (and high velocities) in a few milliseconds.

Recent advances have shown that processing of nitinol can expand thermomechanical capabilities, allowing for multiple shape memories to be embedded within a monolithic structure. Research on multi-memory technology is on-going and may deliver enhanced shape memory devices in the near future, and new materials and material structures, such as hybrid shape memory materials (SMMs) and shape memory composites (SMCs).

== Applications ==
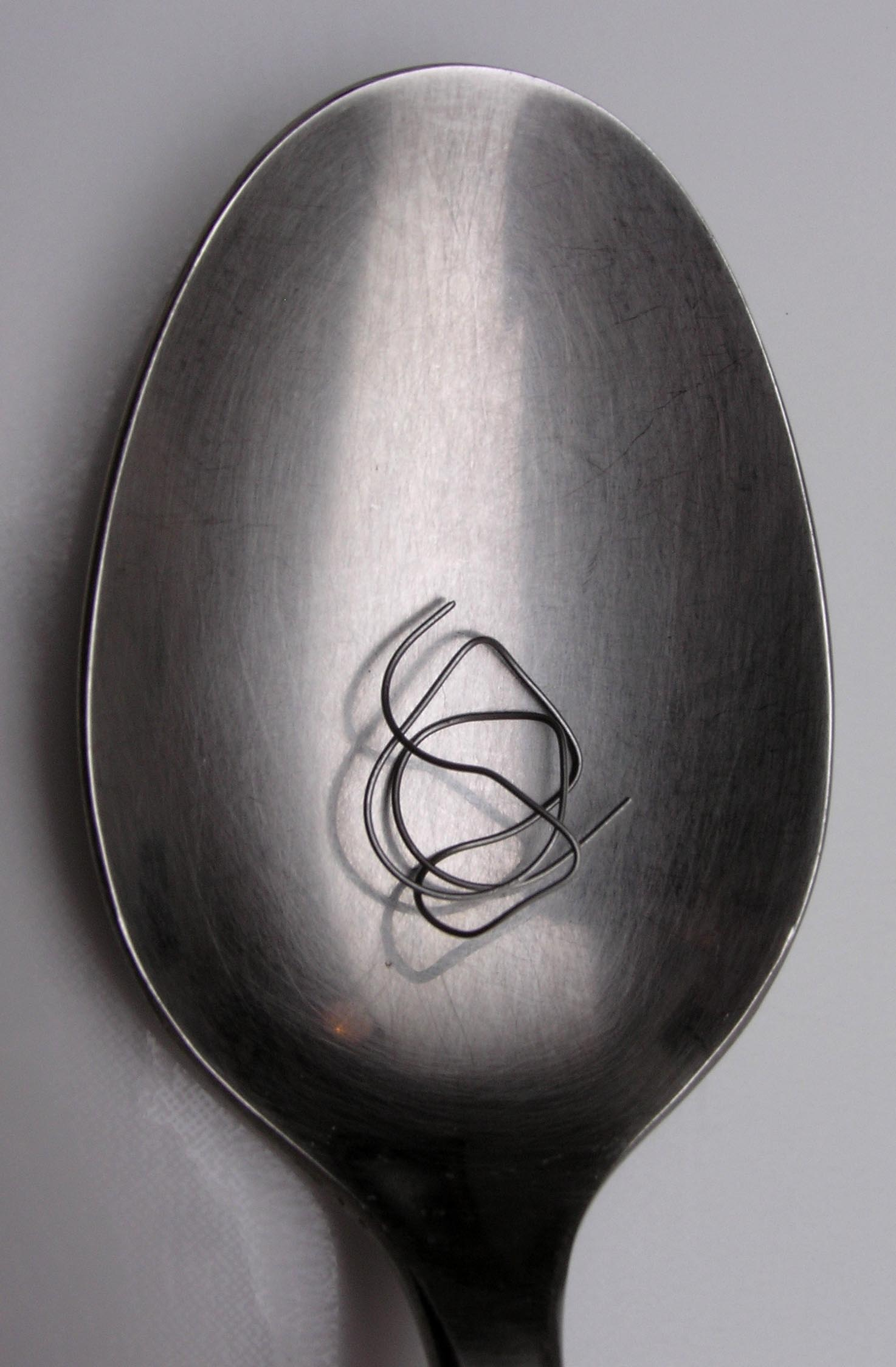
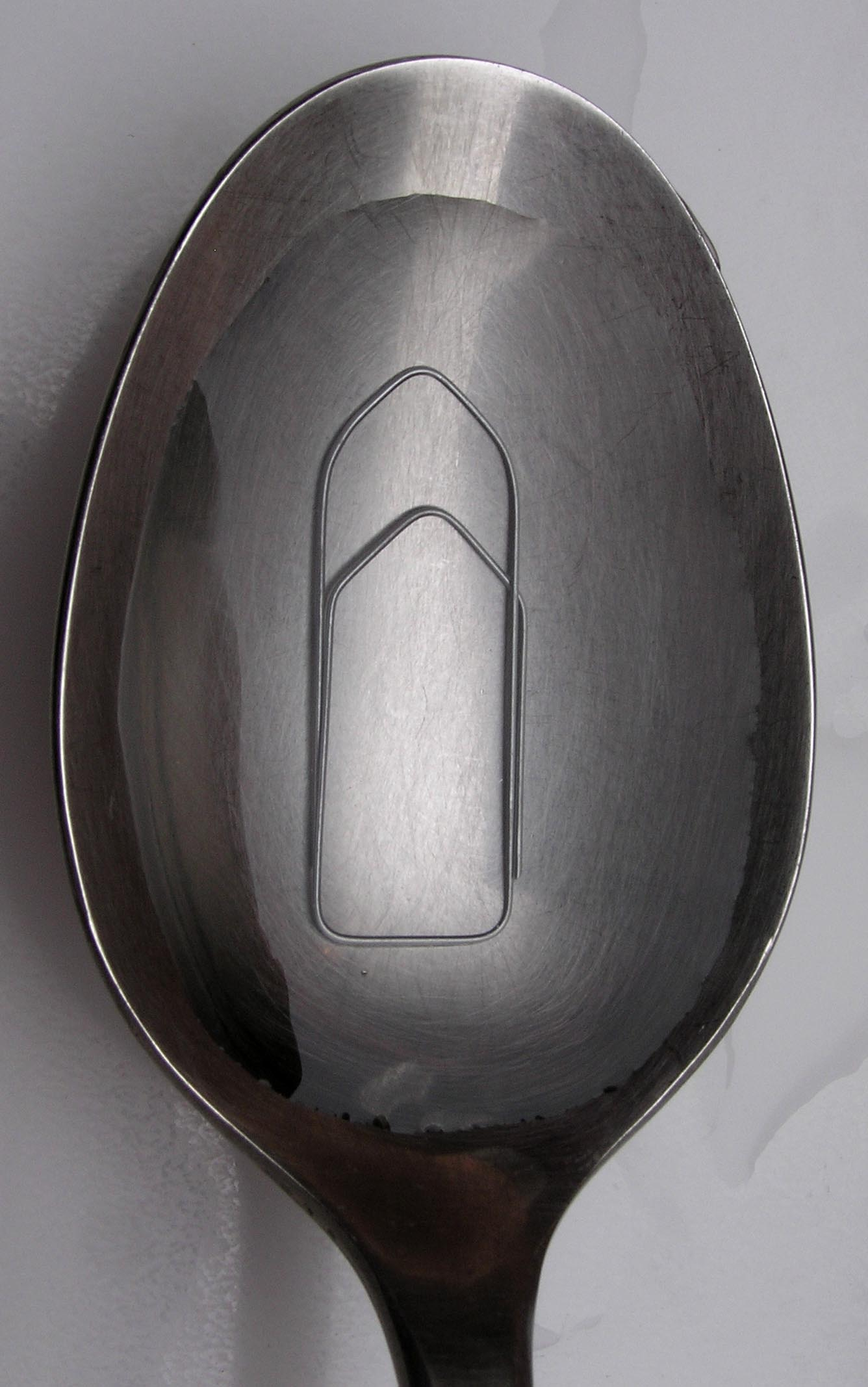
A nitinol paperclip bent and recovered after being placed in hot water

There are four commonly used types of applications for nitinol:

Free recovery
Nitinol is deformed at a low temperature, remains deformed, and then is heated to recover its original shape through the shape memory effect.
Constrained recovery
Similar to free recovery, except that recovery is rigidly prevented and thus a stress is generated.
Work production
The alloy is allowed to recover, but to do so it must act against a force (thus doing work).
Superelasticity
Nitinol acts as a super spring through the superelastic effect.

Superelastic materials undergo stress-induced transformation and are commonly recognized for their shape-memory property. Due to its superelasticity, NiTi wires exhibit an elastocaloric effect, which is stress-triggered heating or cooling. NiTi wires are currently under research as the most promising material for the technology. The process begins with tensile loading on the wire, which causes fluid (within the wire) to flow to HHEX (hot heat exchanger). Simultaneously, heat will be expelled, which can be used to heat the surrounding. In the reverse process, tensile unloading of the wire leads to fluid flowing to CHEX (cold heat exchanger), causing the NiTi wire to absorb heat from the surrounding. Therefore, the temperature of the surrounding can be decreased (cooled).

Elastocaloric devices are often compared with magnetocaloric devices as new methods of efficient heating/cooling. Elastocaloric device made with NiTi wires has an advantage over magnetocaloric device made with gadolinium due to its specific cooling power (at 2 Hz), which is 70X better (7 kWh/kg vs. 0.1 kWh/kg). However, elastocaloric device made with NiTi wires also have limitations, such as its short fatigue life and dependency on large tensile forces (energy consuming).

In 1989 a survey was conducted in the United States and Canada that involved seven organizations. The survey focused on predicting the future technology, market, and applications of SMAs. The companies predicted the following uses of nitinol in a decreasing order of importance: (1) couplings, (2) biomedical and medical, (3) toys, demonstration, novelty items, (4) actuators, (5) heat engines, (6) sensors, (7) cryogenically activated die and bubble memory sockets, and finally (8) lifting devices.

=== Thermal and electrical actuators ===
- Nitinol can be used to replace conventional actuators (solenoids, servo motors, etc.), such as in the Stiquito, a simple hexapod robot.
- Nitinol springs are used in thermal valves for fluidics, where the material both acts as a temperature sensor and an actuator.
- It is used as autofocus actuator in action cameras and as an optical image stabilizer in mobile phones.
- It is used in pneumatic valves for comfort seating and has become an industry standard.
- The 2014 Chevrolet Corvette incorporates nitinol actuators, which replaced heavier motorized actuators to open and close the hatch vent that releases air from the trunk, making it easier to close.

=== Biocompatible and biomedical applications ===
- Nitinol is highly biocompatible and has properties suitable for use in orthopedic implants. Due to nitinol's unique properties it has seen a large demand for use in less invasive medical devices. Nitinol tubing is commonly used in catheters, stents, and superelastic needles.
- In colorectal surgery, the material is used in devices for reconnecting the intestine after removing the pathogens.
- Nitinol is used for devices developed by Franz Freudenthal to treat patent ductus arteriosus, blocking a blood vessel that bypasses the lungs and has failed to close after birth in an infant.
- In dentistry, the material is used in orthodontics for brackets and wires connecting the teeth. Once the SMA wire is placed in the mouth its temperature rises to ambient body temperature. This causes the nitinol to contract back to its original shape, applying a constant force to move the teeth. These SMA wires do not need to be retightened as often as other wires because they can contract as the teeth move unlike conventional stainless steel wires. Additionally, nitinol can be used in endodontics, where nitinol files are used to clean and shape the root canals during the root canal procedure. Because of the high fatigue tolerance and flexibility of nitinol, it greatly decreases the possibility of an endodontic file breaking inside the tooth during root canal treatment, thus improving safety for the patient.
- Another significant application of nitinol in medicine is in stents: a collapsed stent can be inserted into an artery or vein, where body temperature warms the stent and the stent returns to its original expanded shape following removal of a constraining sheath; the stent then helps support the artery or vein to improve blood flow. It is also used as a replacement for sutures—nitinol wire can be woven through two structures then allowed to transform into its preformed shape, which should hold the structures in place.
- Similarly, collapsible structures composed of braided, microscopically-thin nitinol filaments can be used in neurovascular interventions such as stroke thrombolysis, embolization, and intracranial angioplasty.
- Application of nitinol wire in female contraception, specifically in intrauterine devices due to its small, flexible nature and its high efficacy.

=== Damping systems in structural engineering ===
- Superelastic nitinol finds a variety of applications in civil structures such as bridges and buildings. One such application is intelligent reinforced concrete (IRC), which incorporates NiTi wires embedded within the concrete. These wires can sense cracks and contract to heal macro-sized cracks.
- Another application is active tuning of structural natural frequency using nitinol wires to damp vibrations.

=== Other applications and prototypes ===
- Demonstration model heat engines have been built which use nitinol wire to produce mechanical energy from hot and cold heat sources. A prototype commercial engine developed in the 1970s by engineer Ridgway Banks at Lawrence Berkeley National Laboratory, was named the Banks Engine.
- Nitinol is also popular in extremely resilient glasses frames.
- Boeing engineers successfully flight-tested SMA-actuated morphing chevrons on the Boeing 777-300ER Quiet Technology Demonstrator 2.
- The Ford Motor Company has registered a US patent for what it calls a "bicycle derailleur apparatus for controlling bicycle speed". Filed on 22 April 2019, the patent depicts a front derailleur for a bicycle, devoid of cables, instead using two nitinol wires to provide the movement needed to shift gears.
- It is used in some novelty products, such as self-bending spoons which can be used by amateur and stage magicians to demonstrate "psychic" powers or as a practical joke, as the spoon will bend itself when used to stir tea, coffee, or any other warm liquid.
- Due to the high damping capacity of superelastic nitinol, it is also used as a golf club insert.
- Nickel titanium can be used to make the underwires for underwire bras.
- Nickel-titanium alloy is used in aerospace applications such as aircraft pipe joints, spacecraft antennas, fasteners, connecting components, electrical connections, and electromechanical actuators.
- In 1998, the golf manufacturer Ping allowed its WRX department to create the Isoforce series, which originally included a Nitinol face insert. The process was so expensive, models were sold below cost price before being quickly discontinued and replaced with cheaper aluminium and copper inserts. The Anser F, Sedona F and Darby F remain the only golf equipment ever made with Nitinol.
