= Shape-memory alloy =

Alloy which returns to a preset shape when heated

In metallurgy, a shape-memory alloy (SMA) is an alloy that can be deformed when cold but returns to its pre-deformed ("remembered") shape when heated. It is also known in other names such as memory metal, memory alloy, smart metal, smart alloy, and muscle wire. The "memorized geometry" can be modified by fixating the desired geometry and subjecting it to a thermal treatment, for example a wire can be taught to memorize the shape of a coil spring.

Parts made of shape-memory alloys can be lightweight, solid-state alternatives to conventional actuators such as hydraulic, pneumatic, and motor-based systems. They can also be used to make hermetic joints in metal tubing, and it can also replace a sensor-actuator closed loop to control water temperature by governing hot and cold water flow ratio.

== Overview ==
The two most prevalent shape-memory alloys are copper-aluminium-nickel and nickel-titanium (NiTi), but SMAs can also be created by alloying zinc, copper, gold and iron. Although iron-based and copper-based SMAs, such as Fe-Mn-Si, Cu-Zn-Al and Cu-Al-Ni, are commercially available and cheaper than NiTi, NiTi-based SMAs are preferable for most applications due to their stability and practicability as well as their superior thermo-mechanical performance. SMAs can exist in two different phases, with three different crystal structures (i.e. twinned martensite, detwinned martensite, and austenite) and six possible transformations. The thermo-mechanic behavior of the SMAs is governed by a phase transformation between the austenite and the martensite.

NiTi alloys change from austenite to martensite upon cooling starting from a temperature below M_{s}; M_{f} is the temperature at which the transition to martensite completes upon cooling. Accordingly, during heating A_{s} and A_{f} are the temperatures at which the transformation from martensite to austenite starts and finishes.

Applying a mechanical load to the martensite leads to a re-orientation of the crystals, referred to as "de-twinning", which results in a deformation which is not recovered (remembered) after releasing the mechanical load. De-twinning starts at a certain stress σ_{s} and ends at σ_{f} above which martensite continue exhibiting only elastic behavior (as long as the load is below the yield stress). The memorized deformation from detwinning is recovered after heating to austenite.

The phase transformation from austenite to martensite can also occur at constant temperature by applying a mechanical load above a certain level. The transformation is reversed when the load is released.

In this figure the vertical axis represents the martensite fraction. The difference between the heating transition and the cooling transition gives rise to hysteresis where some of the mechanical energy is lost in the process. The shape of the curve depends on the material properties of the shape-memory alloy, such as the alloy's composition and work hardening.

== Shape memory effect ==
This animation illustrates the full shape memory effect: 1. Cooling from austenite to (twinned) martensite, which happens either at beginning of the SMA's lifetime or at the end of a thermal cycle.; 2. Applying a stress to detwin the martensite.; 3. Heating the martensite to reform austenite, restoring the original shape.; 4. Cooling the austenite back to twinned martensite.

The shape memory effect (SME) occurs because a temperature-induced phase transformation reverses deformation, as shown in the previous hysteresis curve. Typically the martensitic phase is monoclinic or orthorhombic (B19' or B19). Since these crystal structures do not have enough slip systems for easy dislocation motion, they deform by twinning—or rather, detwinning.

Martensite is thermodynamically favored at lower temperatures, while austenite (B2 cubic) is thermodynamically favored at higher temperatures. Since these structures have different lattice sizes and symmetry, cooling austenite into martensite introduces internal strain energy in the martensitic phase. To reduce this energy, the martensitic phase forms many twins—this is called "self-accommodating twinning" and is the twinning version of geometrically necessary dislocations. Since the shape memory alloy will be manufactured from a higher temperature and is usually engineered so that the martensitic phase is dominant at operating temperature to take advantage of the shape memory effect, SMAs "start" highly twinned.

When the martensite is loaded, these self-accommodating twins provide an easy path for deformation. Applied stresses will detwin the martensite, but all of the atoms stay in the same position relative to the nearby atoms—no atomic bonds are broken or reformed (as they would be by dislocation motion). Thus, when the temperature is raised and austenite becomes thermodynamically favored, all of the atoms rearrange to the B2 structure which happens to be the same macroscopic shape as the B19' pre-deformation shape. This phase transformation happens extremely quickly and gives SMAs their distinctive "snap".

Repeated use of the shape-memory effect may lead to a shift of the characteristic transformation temperatures (this effect is known as functional fatigue, as it is closely related with a change of microstructural and functional properties of the material). The maximum temperature at which SMAs can no longer be stress induced is called M_{d}, where the SMAs are permanently deformed.

== One-way vs. two-way shape memory ==
Shape-memory alloys have different shape-memory effects. The two common effects are one-way SMA and two-way SMA. A schematic of the effects is shown below. The procedures are very similar: starting from martensite, adding a deformation, heating the sample and cooling it again.

=== One-way memory effect ===

When a shape-memory alloy is in its cold state (below M_{f}), the metal can be bent or stretched and will hold those shapes until heated above the transition temperature. Upon heating, the shape changes to its original. When the metal cools again, it will retain the shape, until deformed again.

With the one-way effect, cooling from high temperatures does not cause a macroscopic shape change. A deformation is necessary to create the low-temperature shape. On heating, transformation starts at A_{s} and is completed at A_{f} (typically 2 to 20 °C or hotter, depending on the alloy or the loading conditions). A_{s} is determined by the alloy type and composition and can vary between −150 °C and 200 °C.

=== Two way effect ===

The two-way shape-memory effect is the effect that the material remembers two different shapes: one at low temperatures, and one at the high temperature. A material that shows a shape-memory effect during both heating and cooling is said to have two-way shape memory. This can also be obtained without the application of an external force (intrinsic two-way effect). The reason the material behaves so differently in these situations lies in training. Training implies that a shape memory can "learn" to behave in a certain way. Under normal circumstances, a shape-memory alloy "remembers" its low-temperature shape, but upon heating to recover the high-temperature shape, immediately "forgets" the low-temperature shape. However, it can be "trained" to "remember" to leave some reminders of the deformed low-temperature condition in the high-temperature phases. One way of training the SMA consists in applying a cyclic thermal load under constant stress field. During this process, internal defects are introduced into the microstructure which generates internal permanent stresses that facilitate the orientation of the martensitic crystals. Therefore, while cooling a trained SMA in austenitic phase under no applied stress, the martensite is formed detwinned due to the internal stresses, which leads to the material shape change. And while heating back the SMA into austenite, it recovers its initial shape.

There are several ways of doing this. A shaped, trained object heated beyond a certain point will lose the two-way memory effect.

== Pseudoelasticity ==
SMAs display a phenomenon sometimes called superelasticity, but is more accurately described as pseudoelasticity. "Superelasticity" implies that the atomic bonds between atoms stretch to an extreme length without incurring plastic deformation. Pseudoelasticity still achieves large, recoverable strains with little to no permanent deformation, but it relies on more complex mechanisms.

An animation of pseudoelasticity

SMAs exhibit at least 3 kinds of pseudoelasticty. The two less-studied kinds of pseudoelasticity are pseudo-twin formation and rubber-like behavior due to short range order.

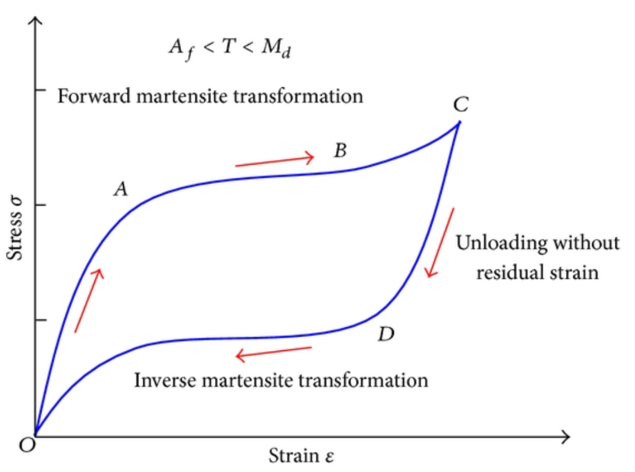
At stresses above the martensitic stress (A), austenite will transform to martensite and induce large macroscopic strains until no austenite remains (C). Upon unloading, martensite will revert to austenite phase beneath the austenitic stress (D), at which point strain will be recovered until the material is fully austenitic and little to no deformation remains.

The main pseudoelastic effect comes from a stress-induced phase transformation. The figure on the right exhibits how this process occurs.

Here a load is isothermally applied to a SMA above the austenite finish temperature, A_{f}, but below the martensite deformation temperature, M_{d}. The figure above illustrates how this is possible, by relating the pseudoelastic stress-induced phase transformation to the shape memory effect temperature induced phase transformation. For a particular point on A_{f,} it is possible to choose a point on the M_{s} line with a higher temperature, as long as that point M_{d} also has a higher stress. The material initially exhibits typical elastic-plastic behavior for metals. However, once the material reaches the martensitic stress, the austenite will transform to martensite and detwin. As previously discussed, this detwinning is reversible when transforming back from martensite to austenite. If large stresses are applied, plastic behavior such as detwinning and slip of the martensite will initiate at sites such as grain boundaries or inclusions. If the material is unloaded before plastic deformation occurs, it will revert to austenite once a critical stress for austenite is reached (σ_{as}). The material will recover nearly all strain that was induced from the structural change, and for some SMAs this can be strains greater than 10 percent. This hysteresis loop shows the work done for each cycle of the material between states of small and large deformations, which is important for many applications.

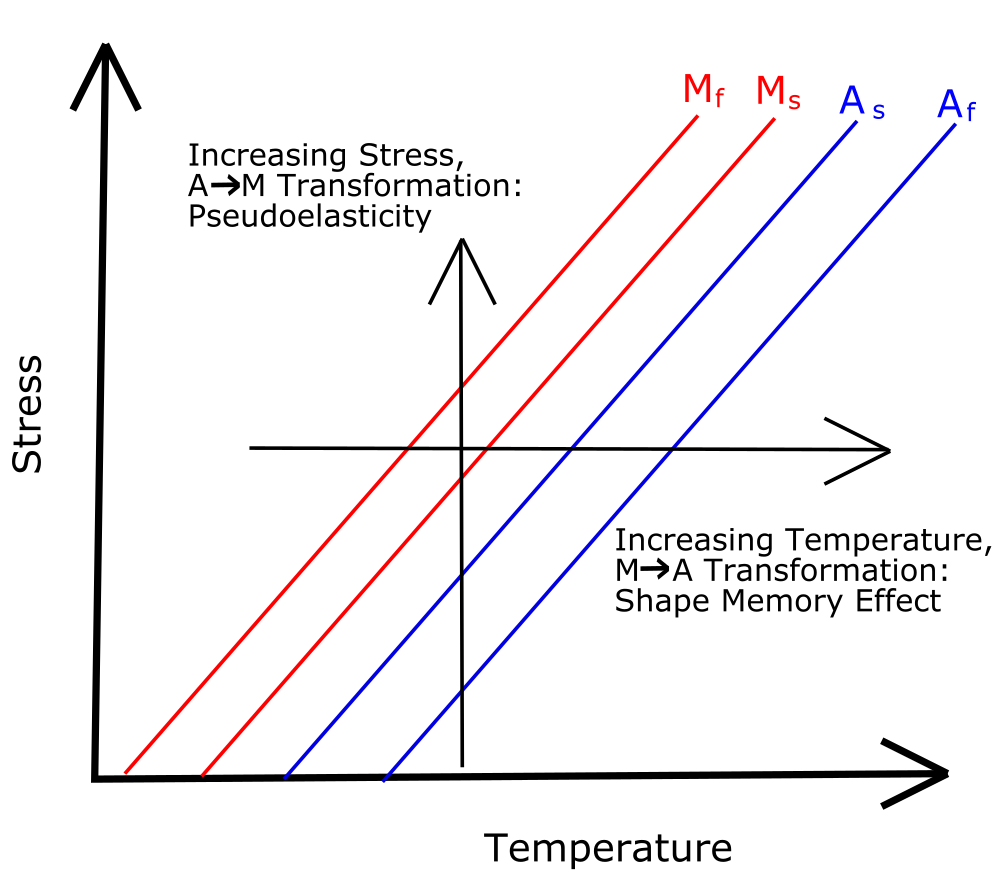
Stress-Temperature graph of martensite and austenite lines in a shape memory alloy.

In a plot of strain versus temperature, the austenite and martensite start and finish lines run parallel. The SME and pseudoelasticity are actually different parts of the same phenomenon, as shown on the left.

The key to the large strain deformations is the difference in crystal structure between the two phases. Austenite generally has a cubic structure while martensite can be monoclinic or another structure different from the parent phase, typically with lower symmetry. For a monoclinic martensitic material such as Nitinol, the monoclinic phase has lower symmetry which is important as certain crystallographic orientations will accommodate higher strains compared to other orientations when under an applied stress. Thus it follows that the material will tend to form orientations that maximize the overall strain prior to any increase in applied stress. One mechanism that aids in this process is the twinning of the martensite phase. In crystallography, a twin boundary is a two-dimensional defect in which the stacking of atomic planes of the lattice are mirrored across the plane of the boundary. Depending on stress and temperature, these deformation processes will compete with permanent deformation such as slip.

σ_{ms} is dependent on parameters such as temperature and the number of nucleation sites for phase nucleation. Interfaces and inclusions will provide general sites for the transformation to begin, and if these are great in number, it will increase the driving force for nucleation. A smaller σ_{ms} will be needed than for homogeneous nucleation. Likewise, increasing temperature will reduce the driving force for the phase transformation, so a larger σ_{ms} will be necessary. One can see that as you increase the operational temperature of the SMA, σ_{ms} will be greater than the yield strength, σ_{y}, and superelasticity will no longer be observable.

== History ==
The first reported steps towards the discovery of the shape-memory effect were taken in the 1930s. According to Otsuka and Wayman, Arne Ölander discovered the pseudoelastic behavior of the Au-Cd alloy in 1932. Greninger and Mooradian (1938) observed the formation and disappearance of a martensitic phase by decreasing and increasing the temperature of a Cu-Zn alloy. The basic phenomenon of the memory effect governed by the thermoelastic behavior of the martensite phase was widely reported a decade later by Kurdjumov and Khandros (1949) and also by Chang and Read (1951).

The nickel-titanium alloys were first developed in 1962–1963 by the United States Naval Ordnance Laboratory and commercialized under the trade name Nitinol (an acronym for Nickel Titanium Naval Ordnance Laboratories). Their remarkable properties were discovered by accident. A sample that was bent out of shape many times was presented at a laboratory management meeting. One of the associate technical directors, Dr. David S. Muzzey, decided to see what would happen if the sample was subjected to heat and held his pipe lighter underneath it. To everyone's amazement the sample stretched back to its original shape.

There is another type of SMA, called a ferromagnetic shape-memory alloy (FSMA), that changes shape under strong magnetic fields. These materials are of particular interest as the magnetic response tends to be faster and more efficient than temperature-induced responses.

Metal alloys are not the only thermally-responsive materials; shape-memory polymers have also been developed, and became commercially available in the late 1990s.

== Crystal structures ==
Many metals have several different crystal structures at the same composition, but most metals do not show this shape-memory effect. The special property that allows shape-memory alloys to revert to their original shape after heating is that their crystal transformation is fully reversible. In most crystal transformations, the atoms in the structure will travel through the metal by diffusion, changing the composition locally, even though the metal as a whole is made of the same atoms. A reversible transformation does not involve this diffusion of atoms, instead all the atoms shift at the same time to form a new structure, much in the way a parallelogram can be made out of a square by pushing on two opposing sides. At different temperatures, different structures are preferred and when the structure is cooled through the transition temperature, the martensitic structure forms from the austenitic phase.

== Manufacture ==
Shape-memory alloys are typically made by casting, using vacuum arc melting or induction melting. These are specialist techniques used to keep impurities in the alloy to a minimum and ensure the metals are well mixed. The ingot is then hot rolled into longer sections and then drawn to turn it into wire.

The way in which the alloys are "trained" depends on the properties wanted. The "training" dictates the shape that the alloy will remember when it is heated. This occurs by heating the alloy so that the dislocations re-order into stable positions, but not so hot that the material recrystallizes. They are heated to between 400 °C and 500 °C for 30 minutes, shaped while hot, and then are cooled rapidly by quenching in water or by cooling with air.

== Properties ==
The copper-based and NiTi-based shape-memory alloys are considered to be engineering materials. These compositions can be manufactured to almost any shape and size.

The yield strength of shape-memory alloys is lower than that of conventional steel, but some compositions have a higher yield strength than plastic or aluminum. The yield stress for Ni Ti can reach 500 MPa. The high cost of the metal itself and the processing requirements make it difficult and expensive to implement SMAs into a design. As a result, these materials are used in applications where the super elastic properties or the shape-memory effect can be exploited. The most common application is in actuation.

One of the advantages to using shape-memory alloys is the high level of recoverable plastic strain that can be induced. The maximum recoverable strain these materials can hold without permanent damage is up to 8% for some alloys. This compares with a maximum strain 0.5% for conventional steels.

== Practical limitations ==
SMA have many advantages over traditional actuators, but do suffer from a series of limitations that may impede practical application. In numerous studies, it was emphasised that only a few of patented shape memory alloy applications are commercially successful due to material limitations combined with a lack of material and design knowledge and associated tools, such as improper design approaches and techniques used. The challenges in designing SMA applications are to overcome their limitations, which include a relatively small usable strain, low actuation frequency, low controllability, low accuracy and low energy efficiency.

=== Response time and response symmetry ===
SMA actuators are typically actuated electrically, where an electric current results in Joule heating. Deactivation typically occurs by free convective heat transfer to the ambient environment. Consequently, SMA actuation is typically asymmetric, with a relatively fast actuation time and a slow deactuation time. A number of methods have been proposed to reduce SMA deactivation time, including forced convection, and lagging the SMA with a conductive material in order to manipulate the heat transfer rate.

Novel methods to enhance the feasibility of SMA actuators include the use of a conductive "lagging". This method uses a thermal paste to rapidly transfer heat from the SMA by conduction. This heat is then more readily transferred to the environment by convection as the outer radii (and heat transfer area) are significantly greater than for the bare wire. This method results in a significant reduction in deactivation time and a symmetric activation profile. As a consequence of the increased heat transfer rate, the required current to achieve a given actuation force is increased.

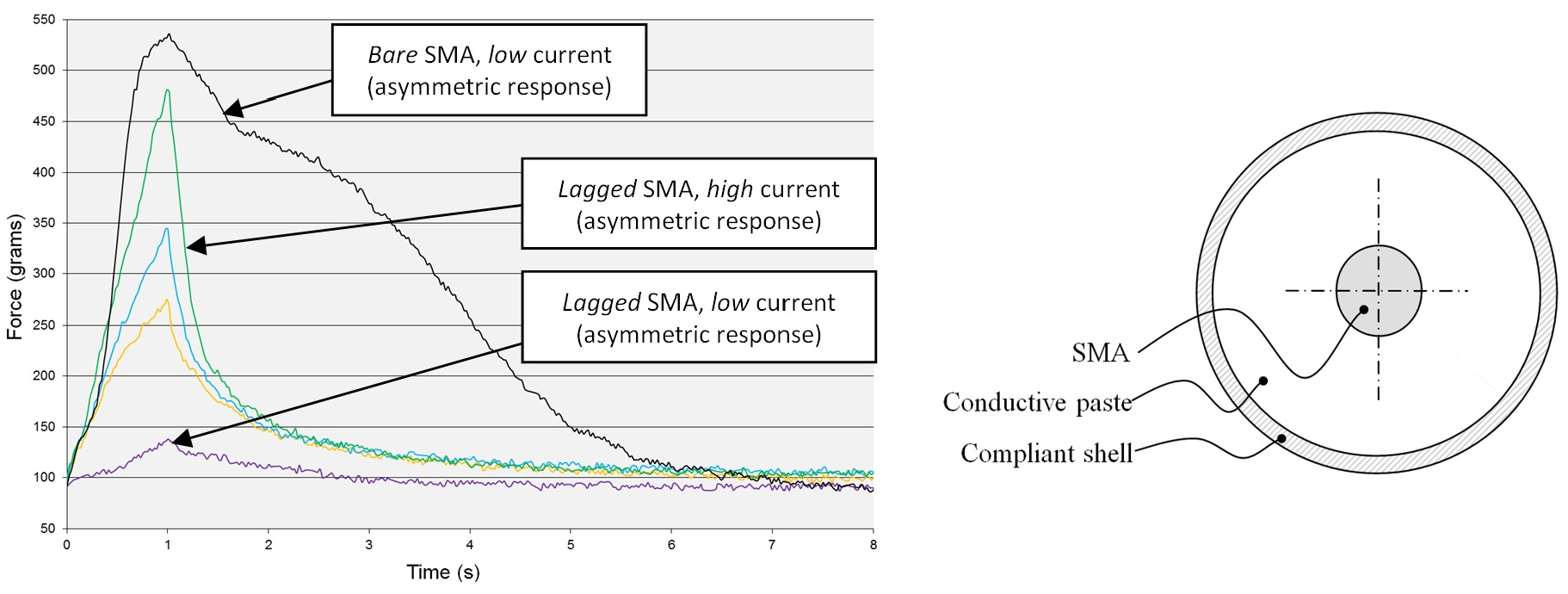
Comparative force-time response of bare and lagged Ni-Ti shape memory alloy.

=== Structural fatigue and functional fatigue ===
SMA is subject to structural fatigue – a failure mode by which cyclic loading results in the initiation and propagation of a crack that eventually results in catastrophic loss of function by fracture. The physics behind this fatigue mode is accumulation of microstructural damage during cyclic loading. This failure mode is observed in most engineering materials, not just SMAs.

SMAs are also subject to functional fatigue, a failure mode not typical of most engineering materials, whereby the SMA does not fail structurally but loses its shape-memory/superelastic characteristics over time. As a result of cyclic loading (both mechanical and thermal), the material loses its ability to undergo a reversible phase transformation. For example, the working displacement in an actuator decreases with increasing cycle numbers. The physics behind this is gradual change in microstructure—more specifically, the buildup of accommodation slip dislocations. This is often accompanied by a significant change in transformation temperatures. Design of SMA actuators may also influence both structural and functional fatigue of SMA, such as the pulley configurations in SMA-Pulley system.

=== Unintended actuation ===
SMA actuators are typically actuated electrically by Joule heating. If the SMA is used in an environment where the ambient temperature is uncontrolled, unintentional actuation by ambient heating may occur.

== Applications ==
=== Industrial ===
==== Aircraft and spacecraft ====
Boeing, General Electric Aircraft Engines, Goodrich Corporation, NASA, Texas A&M University and All Nippon Airways developed the Variable Geometry Chevron using a NiTi SMA. Such a variable area fan nozzle (VAFN) design would allow for quieter and more efficient jet engines in the future. In 2005 and 2006, Boeing conducted successful flight testing of this technology.

SMAs are being explored as vibration dampers for launch vehicles and commercial jet engines. The large amount of hysteresis observed during the superelastic effect allow SMAs to dissipate energy and dampen vibrations. These materials show promise for reducing the high vibration loads on payloads during launch as well as on fan blades in commercial jet engines, allowing for more lightweight and efficient designs. SMAs also exhibit potential for other high shock applications such as ball bearings and landing gear.

There is also strong interest in using SMAs for a variety of actuator applications in commercial jet engines, which would significantly reduce their weight and boost efficiency. Further research needs to be conducted in this area, however, to increase the transformation temperatures and improve the mechanical properties of these materials before they can be successfully implemented. A review of recent advances in high-temperature shape-memory alloys (HTSMAs) is presented by Ma et al.

A variety of wing-morphing technologies are also being explored.

==== Automotive ====
The first high-volume product (> 5Mio actuators / year) is an automotive valve used to control low pressure pneumatic bladders in a car seat that adjust the contour of the lumbar support / bolsters. The overall benefits of SMA over traditionally used solenoids in this application (lower noise/EMC/weight/form factor/power consumption) were the crucial factor in the decision to replace the old standard technology with SMA.

The 2014 Chevrolet Corvette became the first vehicle to incorporate SMA actuators, which replaced heavier motorized actuators to open and close the hatch vent that releases air from the trunk, making it easier to close. A variety of other applications are also being targeted, including electric generators to generate electricity from exhaust heat and on-demand air dams to optimize aerodynamics at various speeds.

==== Robotics ====
There have also been limited studies on using these materials in robotics, for example the hobbyist robot Stiquito (and "Roboterfrau Lara"), as they make it possible to create very lightweight robots. Recently, a prosthetic hand was introduced by Loh et al. that can almost replicate the motions of a human hand [Loh2005]. Other biomimetic applications are also being explored. Weak points of the technology are energy inefficiency, slow response times, and large hysteresis.

==== Valves ====
SMAs are also used for actuating valves. The SMA valves are particularly compact in design.

==== Bio-engineered robotic hand ====
There is some SMA-based prototypes of robotic hand that using shape memory effect (SME) to move fingers.

==== Civil structures ====
SMAs find a variety of applications in civil structures such as bridges and buildings. In the form of rebars or plates, they can be used for flexural, shear and seismic strengthening of concrete and steel structures. Another application is Intelligent Reinforced Concrete (IRC), which incorporates SMA wires embedded within the concrete. These wires can sense cracks and contract to heal micro-sized cracks. Also the active tuning of structural natural frequency using SMA wires to dampen vibrations is possible, as well as the usage of SMA fibers in concrete.

==== Piping ====
The first consumer commercial application was a shape-memory coupling for piping, e.g. oil pipe lines, for industrial applications, water pipes and similar types of piping for consumer/commercial applications.

=== Consumer electronics ===
==== Smartphone cameras ====
Several smartphone companies have released handsets with optical image stabilisation (OIS) modules incorporating SMA actuators, manufactured under licence from Cambridge Mechatronics.

=== Medicine ===
Shape-memory alloys are applied in medicine, for example, as fixation devices for osteotomies in orthopaedic surgery, as the actuator in surgical tools; active steerable surgical needles for minimally invasive percutaneous cancer interventions in the surgical procedures such as biopsy and brachytherapy, in dental braces to exert constant tooth-moving forces on the teeth, in Capsule Endoscopy they can be used as a trigger for biopsy action.

The late 1980s saw the commercial introduction of Nitinol as an enabling technology in a number of minimally invasive endovascular medical applications. While more costly than stainless steel, the self expanding properties of Nitinol alloys manufactured to BTR (Body Temperature Response), have provided an attractive alternative to balloon expandable devices in stent grafts where it gives the ability to adapt to the shape of certain blood vessels when exposed to body temperature. On average, 50% of all peripheral vascular stents currently available on the worldwide market are manufactured with Nitinol.

==== Optometry ====
Eyeglass frames made from titanium-containing SMAs are marketed under the trademarks Flexon and TITANflex. These frames are usually made out of shape-memory alloys that have their transition temperature set below the expected room temperature. This allows the frames to undergo large deformation under stress, yet regain their intended shape once the metal is unloaded again. The very large apparently elastic strains are due to the stress-induced martensitic effect, where the crystal structure can transform under loading, allowing the shape to change temporarily under load. This means that eyeglasses made of shape-memory alloys are more robust against being accidentally damaged.

==== Orthopedic surgery ====
Memory metal has been utilized in orthopedic surgery as a fixation-compression device for osteotomies, typically for lower extremity procedures. The device, usually in the form of a large staple, is stored in a refrigerator in its malleable form and is implanted into pre-drilled holes in the bone across an osteotomy. As the staple warms it returns to its non-malleable state and compresses the bony surfaces together to promote bone union.

==== Dentistry ====
The range of applications for SMAs has grown over the years, a major area of development being dentistry. One example is the prevalence of dental braces using SMA technology to exert constant tooth-moving forces on the teeth; the nitinol archwire was developed in 1972 by orthodontist George Andreasen. This revolutionized clinical orthodontics. Andreasen's alloy has a patterned shape memory, expanding and contracting within given temperature ranges because of its geometric programming.

Harmeet D. Walia later utilized the alloy in the manufacture of root canal files for endodontics.

==== Essential tremor ====
Traditional active cancellation techniques for tremor reduction use electrical, hydraulic, or pneumatic systems to actuate an object in the direction opposite to the disturbance. However, these systems are limited due to the large infrastructure required to produce large amplitudes of power at human tremor frequencies. SMAs have proven to be an effective method of actuation in hand-held applications, and have enabled a new class active tremor cancellation devices. One recent example of such device is the Liftware spoon, developed by Verily Life Sciences subsidiary Lift Labs.

=== Engines ===
Experimental solid state heat engines, operating from the relatively small temperature differences in cold and hot water reservoirs, have been developed since the 1970s, including the Banks Engine, developed by Ridgway Banks.

=== Crafts ===
Sold in small round lengths for use in affixment-free bracelets.

=== Heating and cooling ===
German scientists at Saarland University have produced a prototype machine that transfers heat using a nickel-titanium ("nitinol") alloy wire wrapped around a rotating cylinder. As the cylinder rotates, heat is absorbed on one side and released on the other, as the wire changes from its "superelastic" state to its unloaded state. According to a 2019 article released by Saarland University, the efficiency by which the heat is transferred appears to be higher than that of a typical heat pump or air conditioner.

Almost all air conditioners and heat pumps in use today employ vapor-compression of refrigerants. Over time, some of the refrigerants used in these systems leak into the atmosphere and contribute to global warming. If the new technology, which uses no refrigerants, proves economical and practical, it might offer a significant breakthrough in the effort to reduce climate change.

=== Clamping Systems ===
Shape memory alloys (SMAs), such as nickel-titanium (Nitinol), are used in clamping systems due to their unique thermo-responsive behavior. The clamps made from SMA are used in the dentofacial surgery to heal mandibular fractures.

== Materials ==
A variety of alloys exhibit the shape-memory effect. Alloying constituents can be adjusted to control the transformation temperatures of the SMA. Some common systems include the following (by no means an exhaustive list):

- Ag-Cd 44/49 at.% Cd
- Au-Cd 46.5/50 at.% Cd
- Co-Ni-Al
- Co-Ni-Ga
- Cu-Al-Be-X(X:Zr, B, Cr, Gd)
- Cu-Al-Ni 14/14.5 wt.% Al, 3/4.5 wt.% Ni
- Cu-Al-Ni-Hf
- Cu-Sn approx. 15 at.% Sn
- Cu-Zn 38.5/41.5 wt.% Zn
- Cu-Zn-X (X = Si, Al, Sn)
- Fe-Mn-Si
- Fe-Pt approx. 25 at.% Pt
- Mn-Cu 5/35 at.% Cu
- Ni-Fe-Ga
- Ni-Ti approx. 55–60 wt.% Ni
- Ni-Ti-Hf
- Ni-Ti-Pd
- Ni-Mn-Ga
- Ni-Mn-Ga-Cu
- Ni-Mn-Ga-Co
- Ti-Nb
