= Ivan De Araujo =

Brazilian neuroscientist

- Education: University of Brasilia
- Scientific career
- Fields: Gut-Brain Axis
- Workplaces: Max Planck Institute for Biological Cybernetics; Icahn School of Medicine at Mount Sinai; Yale University; University of Oxford
- Thesis: Taste and Olfactory Representations in the Human Brain (2003)
- Doctoral advisor: Edmund T. Rolls

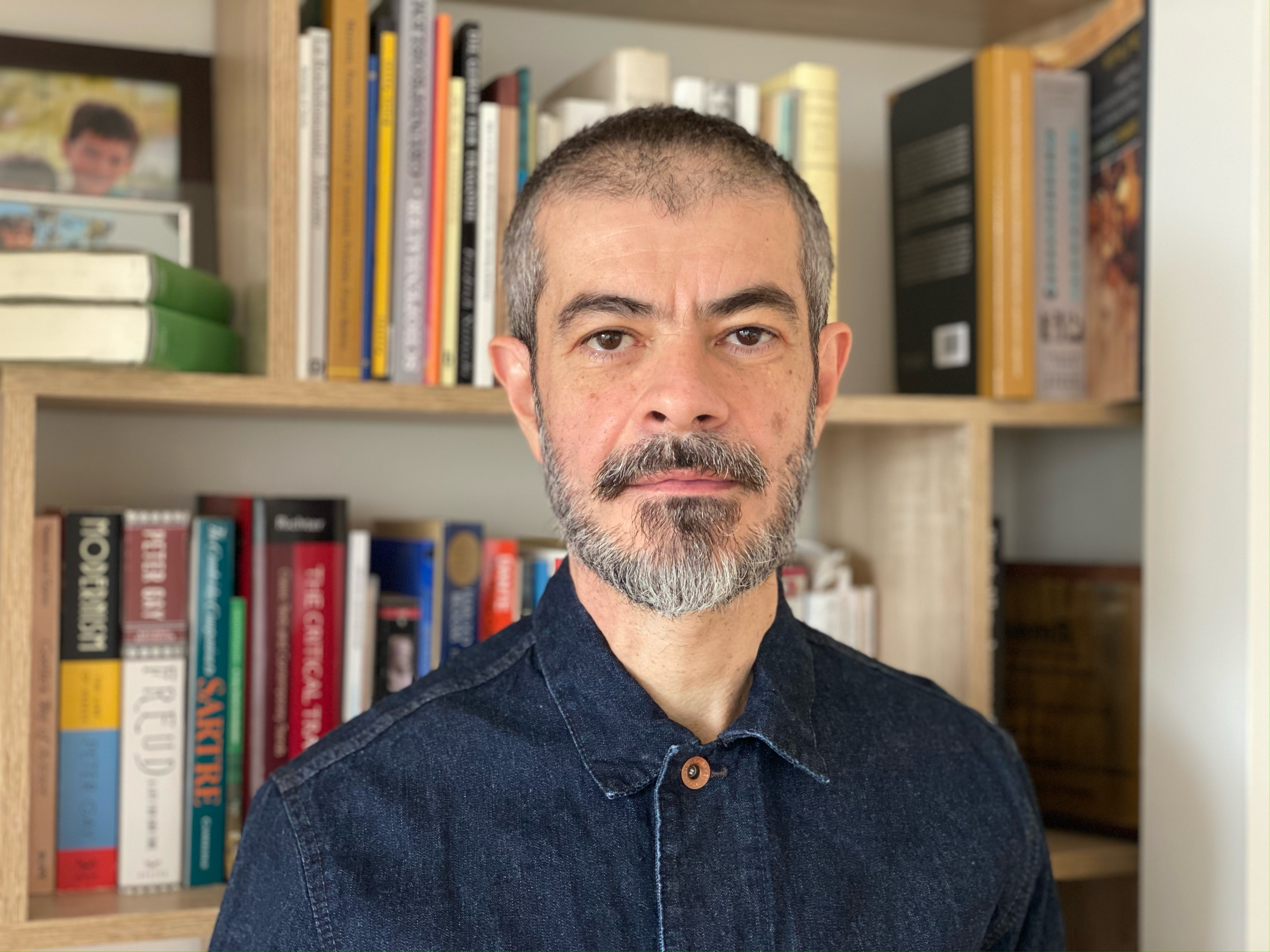
Ivan De Araujo in 2021

Ivan De Araujo is a Brazilian neuroscientist. He is a director at the Max Planck Institute for Biological Cybernetics in Tübingen, Germany, along with Peter Dayan. He is known for his seminal investigations on sugar preference and on the reward functions of the gut-brain axis. After describing the taste-independent reward phenomenon, he pioneered studies linking the intestine to the brain dopamine system.

== Career and research ==
De Araujo's doctoral thesis focused on cortical mechanisms linked to the pleasurable perceptions associated with taste and flavors. After his doctorate, he held a postdoctoral research position with Miguel Nicolelis at Duke University. He then took up an assistant professor position at the Pierce Laboratories at Yale University, where he was eventually appointed Professor of Psychiatry. Between 2018 and 2023, he was a professor of neuroscience at Mount Sinai Hospital New York. In May 2023, the Max Planck Society announced his appointment as a Director at the Max Planck Institute for Biological Cybernetics in Tübingen.

In 2008, De Araujo and colleagues showed that taste-blind mice could form preferences for caloric sugars, and that their brains release the pleasure neurotransmitter dopamine during sugar consumption, despite absence of taste function. This implies that sugar preference is a biological phenomenon by which sugar is preferred over artificial sweeteners. His group then engaged on a series of studies to identify the gut-brain reward axis. Ten years later, the research resulted in the identification of the vagus nerve as a key conductor of reward signals from the body to the brain. This provided a basis for understanding how our brains form preferences for calorically dense foods via unconscious processes.
