= Jennifer Li (neuroscientist) =

Computational neuroscience researcher

- Education: Harvard University (PhD)
- Known for: Neural Mechanisms of Motivation, Attention, Perception, and Decision Making
- Scientific career
- Doctoral advisor: Alex Schier and Florian Engert

Jennifer M. Li is an American neuroscientist and bioengineer. She is a Systems Neuroscience & Neuroengineering researcher who is a Max Planck Research Group Leader at the RoLi lab at the Max Planck Institute for Biological Cybernetics. She records and manipulates neural activity in larval zebra fish to research motivation and attention. and has been published in the journal Nature for her work on how the zebra fish brain switches between internal states when foraging for live prey. The RoLi lab has developed a revolutionary microscopy systems that enable whole-brain imaging of freely swimming larval zebra fish. With this technology, Li and Robson aim to investigate natural behaviors in the zebra fish, including spatial navigation, social behavior, feeding, and reward.

== Background and education ==
Jennifer Li received her B.A. in Molecular Biology from Princeton University, where she worked on host-parasite symbiosis and embryonic development in the Wieschaus lab. She received her Ph.D. from Harvard University, where she worked on operant learning and brain-wide neural imaging in the Schier and Engert labs. During her graduate education at Harvard University, Li was a Rowland Junior Fellow in the Rowland Institute at Harvard University. At the Rowland Institute, Li, along with Drew Robson, led their experiment on zebra fish before finishing the project at the Max Planck Institute for Biological Cybernetics.

== Career ==
Jennifer Li and Drew Robson combined brain tracking with a variant of HiLo microscopy to build Differential Illumination Focal Filtering (DIFF) microscopy

== Publications ==
Her most cited publications are:

- Misha B. Ahrens, Michael B Orger, Drew N Robson, Jennifer M Li, Philipp J Keller, "Whole-brain functional imaging at cellular resolution using light-sheet microscopy" Nature Methods 10 (5), 413-420 (2013)
- MB Ahrens, JM Li, MB Orger, DN Robson, AF Schier, F Engert, ... "Brain-wide neuronal dynamics during motor adaptation in zebrafish" Nature 485 (7399), 471-477 (2012)
- HM Frydman, JM Li, DN Robson, E Wieschaus, "Somatic stem cell niche tropism in Wolbachia" Nature 441 (7092), 509-512 (2006)
- PM Ferree, HM Frydman, JM Li, J Cao, E Wieschaus, W Sullivan "Wolbachia utilizes host microtubules and Dynein for anterior localization in the Drosophila oocyte" PLOS Pathog 1 (2), e14 (2005)
