= Crawler (BEAM) =

Type of robot

In BEAM robotics, a crawler is a robot that has a mode of locomotion by tracks or by transferring the robot's body on limbs or appendages. These do not drag parts of their body on the ground.

In the original paper "living machines" from 1995, two types of robots were introduced which was the Walkman (a simple crawler) and Spyder, which is a more elaborated legged robot. The difference between a walker and a crawler is, that the crawler is more primitive. It has robot legs and can move forward on the carpet but the legs don't have dedicated joints for articulated movements. Instead they are mounted directly on the robot's base.

The design of a crawler robot isn't specified in detail and each robot engineer is allowed to build their own version. Sometimes, crawling robots are equipped with dedicated microcontrollers plus a radio controlled chipset while in other implementations a minimalist approach is used. What all these robots have in common is, that they are following the philosophy of Biology, Electronics, Aesthetics and Mechanics which is about imitating biological bugs.

A possible alternative control over teleoperation is a nv network which is a specialized form of a central pattern generator. This is a pseudorandom number generator which is producing an oscillating signal. It moves the legs similar to a clockwork.

== Genera ==
- Turbots: Rolls over and over as a mode of locomotion via arms or flagella.
- Inchworms: Driven mode of locomotion via the robot's body undulating; this undulation moves part of the body ahead, while the rest of the chassis is on the ground.
- Tracked robots: "Track-ed" wheel locomotion; tank-like action.
