= BEAM robotics =

Robotics with analogue circuits

BEAM robotics (from biology, electronics, aesthetics and mechanics) is a style of robotics that primarily uses simple analogue circuits, such as comparators, instead of a microprocessor in order to produce an unusually simple design. While not as flexible as microprocessor based robotics, BEAM robotics can be robust and efficient in performing the task for which it was designed.

A BEAM robot may use a set of analog circuits, mimicking biological neurons, to facilitate the robot's response to its working environment.

== Mechanisms and principles ==
The basic BEAM principles focus on a stimulus-response based ability within a machine. The underlying mechanism was invented by Mark W. Tilden where the circuit (or a Nv net of Nv neurons) is used to simulate biological neuron behaviours. Some similar research was previously done by Ed Rietman in 'Experiments In Artificial Neural Networks'. Tilden's circuit is often compared to a shift register, but with several important features making it a useful circuit in a mobile robot.

Other rules that are included (and to varying degrees applied):

1. Use the lowest number possible of electronic elements ("keep it simple")
2. Recycle and reuse technoscrap
3. Use radiant energy (such as solar power)

There are a large number of BEAM robots designed to use solar power from small solar arrays to power a "Solar Engine" which creates autonomous robots capable of operating under a wide range of lighting conditions. Besides the simple computational layer of Tilden's "Nervous Networks", BEAM has brought a multitude of useful tools to the roboticist's toolbox. The "Solar Engine" circuit, many H-bridge circuits for small motor control, tactile sensor designs, and meso-scale (palm-sized) robot construction techniques have been documented and shared by the BEAM community.

== BEAM robots ==
Being focused on "reaction-based" behaviors (as originally inspired by the work of Rodney Brooks), BEAM robotics attempts to copy the characteristics and behaviours of biological organisms, with the ultimate goal of domesticating these "wild" robots. The aesthetics of BEAM robots derive from the principle "form follows function" modulated by the particular design choices the builder makes while implementing the desired functionality.

=== Disputes in the name ===
Various people have varying ideas about what BEAM actually stands for. The most widely accepted meaning is biology, electronics, aesthetics, and mechanics.

This term originated with Mark Tilden during a discussion at the Ontario Science Centre in 1990. Mark was displaying a selection of his original bots which he had built while working at the University of Waterloo.

However, there are many other semi-popular names in use, including:

- Biotechnology, ethology, analogy, morphology
- Building, evolution, anarchy, modularity

=== Microcontrollers ===
Unlike many other types of robots controlled by microcontrollers, BEAM robots are built on the principle of using multiple simple behaviours linked directly to sensor systems with little signal conditioning. This design philosophy is closely echoed in the classic book "Vehicles: Experiments in Synthetic Psychology". Through a series of thought experiments, this book explores the development of complex robot behaviours through simple inhibitory and excitory sensor links to the actuators. Microcontrollers and computer programming are usually not a part of a traditional (aka., "pure" ) BEAM robot due to the very low-level hardware-centric design philosophy.

There are successful robot designs mating the two technologies. These "hybrids" fulfill a need for robust control systems with the added flexibility of dynamic programming, like the "horse-and-rider" topology BEAMbots (e.g. the ScoutWalker 3). 'Horse' behavior is implemented with traditional BEAM technology but a microcontroller based 'rider' can guide that behavior so as to accomplish the goals of the 'rider'.

=== Types ===
There are various "-trope" BEAMbots, which attempt to achieve a specific goal. Of the series, the phototropes are the most prevalent, as light-seeking would be the most beneficial behaviour for a solar-powered robot.

- Audiotropes react to sound sources.
  - Audiophiles go towards sound sources.
  - Audiophobes go away from sound sources.
- Phototropes ("light-seekers") react to light sources.
  - Photophiles (also photovores) go toward light sources.
  - Photophobes go away from light sources.
- Radiotropes react to radio frequency sources.
  - Radiophiles go toward RF sources.
  - Radiophobes go away from RF sources.
- Thermotropes react to heat sources.
  - Thermophiles go toward heat sources.
  - Thermophobes go away from heat sources.

=== General ===
BEAMbots have a variety of movements and positioning mechanisms. These include:

- Sitters: Unmoving robots that have a physically passive purpose.
  - Beacons: Transmit a signal (usually a navigational blip) for other BEAMbots to use.
  - Pummers : Display a "light show" or a pattern of sounds. Pummers are often nocturnal robots that store solar energy during the day, then activate during the night.
  - Ornaments : A catch-all name for sitters which are not beacons or pummers. Many times, these are mostly electronic art.
- Squirmers: Stationary robots that perform an interesting action (usually by moving some sort of limbs or appendages).
  - Magbots: use magnetic fields for their mode of animation.
  - Flagwavers: Move a display (or "flag") around at a certain frequency.
  - Heads: Pivot and follow some detectable phenomena, such as a light (These are popular in the BEAM community. They can be stand-alone robots, but are more often incorporated into a larger robot.).
  - Vibrators: Use a small pager motor with an off-centre weight to shake themselves about.
- Sliders: Robots that move by sliding body parts smoothly along a surface while remaining in contact with it.
  - Snakes: Move using a horizontal wave motion.
  - Earthworms: Move using a longitudinal wave motion.
- Crawlers: Robots that move using tracks or by rolling the robot's body with some sort of appendage. The body of the robot is not dragged on the ground.
  - Turbots: Roll their entire bodies using their arms or flagella.
  - Inchworms: Move part of their bodies ahead, while the rest of the chassis is on the ground.
  - Tracked robots: Use tracked wheels, like a tank.
- Jumpers: Robots which propel themselves off the ground as a means of locomotion.
  - Vibrobots: Produce an irregular shaking motion moving themselves around a surface.
  - Springbots: Move forward by bouncing in one particular direction.
- Rollers: Robots that move by rolling all or part of their body.
  - Symets: Driven using a single motor with its shaft touching the ground, and moves in different directions depending on which of several symmetric contact points around the shaft are touching the ground.
  - Solarrollers: Solar-powered cars that use a single motor driving one or more wheels; often designed to complete a fairly short, straight and level course in the shortest amount of time.
  - Poppers: Use two motors with separate solar engines; rely on differential sensors to achieve a goal.
  - Miniballs: Shift their centre of mass, causing their spherical bodies to roll.
- Walkers: Robots that move using legs with differential ground contact. BEAM walkers generally use Nv networks and are not programmed in any way—they walk and respond to terrain via resistive input from their motors.
  - Motor-driven: Use motors to move their legs (typically 3 motors or less).
  - Muscle wire-driven: Use nitinol (nickel - titanium alloy) wires for their leg actuators.
- Swimmers: Also called aquabots or aquavores. Robots that move on or below the surface of a liquid (typically water).
  - Boatbots: Operate on the surface of a liquid.
  - Subbots: Operate under the surface of a liquid.
- Fliers: Robots that move through the air for sustained periods.
  - Helicopters: Use a powered rotor to provide both lift and propulsion.
  - Planes: Use fixed or flapping wings to generate lift.
  - Blimps: Use a neutrally-buoyant balloon for lift.
- Climbers: Robot that moves up or down a vertical surface, usually on a track such as a rope or wire.

== Applications and current progress ==
At present, autonomous robots have seen limited commercial application, with some exceptions such as the iRobot Roomba robotic vacuum cleaner and a few lawn-mowing robots. The main practical application of BEAM has been in the rapid prototyping of motion systems and hobby/education applications. Mark Tilden has successfully used BEAM for the prototyping of products for Wow-Wee Robotics, as evidenced by B.I.O.Bug and RoboRaptor. Solarbotics Ltd., Bug'n'Bots, JCM InVentures Inc., and PagerMotors.com have also brought BEAM-related hobby and educational goods to the marketplace. Vex has also developed Hexbugs, tiny BEAM robots.

Aspiring BEAM roboticists often have problems with the lack of direct control over "pure" BEAM control circuits. There is ongoing work to evaluate biomorphic techniques that copy natural systems because they seem to have an incredible performance advantage over traditional techniques. There are many examples of how tiny insect brains are capable of far better performance than the most advanced microelectronics.

Another barrier to widespread application of BEAM technology is the perceived random nature of the 'nervous network', which requires new techniques to be learned by the builder to successfully diagnose and manipulate the characteristics of the circuitry. A think-tank of international academics meet annually in Telluride, Colorado to address this issue directly, and until recently, Mark Tilden has been part of this effort (he had to withdraw due to his new commercial commitments with Wow-Wee toys).

Having no long-term memory, BEAM robots generally do not learn from past behaviour. However, there has been work in the BEAM community to address this issue. One of the most advanced BEAM robots in this vein is Bruce Robinson's Hider, which has an impressive degree of capability for a microprocessor-less design.

== Publications ==
Patents

- U.S. patent 613,809 - Method of and Apparatus for Controlling Mechanism of Moving Vehicle or Vehicles - Tesla's "telautomaton" patent; First logic gate.
- U.S. patent 5,325,031 - Adaptive robotic nervous systems and control circuits therefor - Tilden's patent; A self-stabilizing control circuit using pulse delay circuits for controlling the limbs of a limbed robot, and a robot incorporating such a circuit; artificial "neurons".

Books and papers

- Conrad, James M., and Jonathan W. Mills, "Stiquito: advanced experiments with a simple and inexpensive robot", The future for nitinol-propelled walking robots, Mark W. Tilden. Los Alamitos, Calif., IEEE Computer Society Press, c1998. LCCN 96029883 ISBN 0-8186-7408-3
- Tilden, Mark W., and Brosl Hasslacher, "Living Machines". Los Alamos National Laboratory, Los Alamos, NM 87545, USA.
- Tilden, Mark W. and Brosl Hasslacher, "The Design of "Living" Biomech Machines: How low can one go?"". Los Alamos National Laboratory, Los Alamos, NM 87545, USA.
- Still, Susanne, and Mark W. Tilden, "Controller for a four legged walking machine". ETH Zuerich, Institute of Neuroinformatics, and Biophysics Division, Los Alamos National Laboratory.
- Braitenberg, Valentino, "Vehicles: Experiments in Synthetic Psychology", 1984. ISBN 0-262-52112-1
- Rietman, Ed, "Experiments In Artificial Neural Networks", 1988. ISBN 0-8306-0237-2
- Tilden, Mark W., and Brosl Hasslacher, "Robotics and Autonomous Machines: The Biology and Technology of Intelligent Autonomous Agents", LANL Paper ID: LA-UR-94-2636, Spring 1995.
- Dewdney, A.K. "Photovores: Intelligent Robots are Constructed From Castoffs". Scientific American Sept 1992, v267, n3, p42(1)
- Smit, Michael C., and Mark Tilden, "Beam Robotics". Algorithm, Vol. 2, No. 2, March 1991, Pg 15–19.
- Hrynkiw, David M., and Tilden, Mark W., "Junkbots, Bugbots, and Bots on Wheels", 2002. ISBN 0-07-222601-3 (Book support website)

== See also ==
- Analogue robot – a robot that uses analog circuitry to go towards a simple goal
- Braitenberg vehicle – a robot that can exhibit intelligent behavior while remaining completely stateless
- Brosl Hasslacher – theoretical physicist
- Behaviour-based robotics – branch of robotics that does not use an internal model of the environment
- Emergent behaviour – the process of complex pattern formation from simpler rules
- Protoscience
- Stiquito – a hobbyist robot designed as a nitinol-powered hexapod walker
- Turtle (robot) – early forms of the turtlebot were the beginning of BEAM work
- William Grey Walter – neurophysiologist and roboticist
- Wired intelligence – a robot that has no programmed microprocessor and possesses analogue electronics between its sensors and motors that gives it seemingly intelligent actions
