= Wolfgang Grodd =

German radiologist

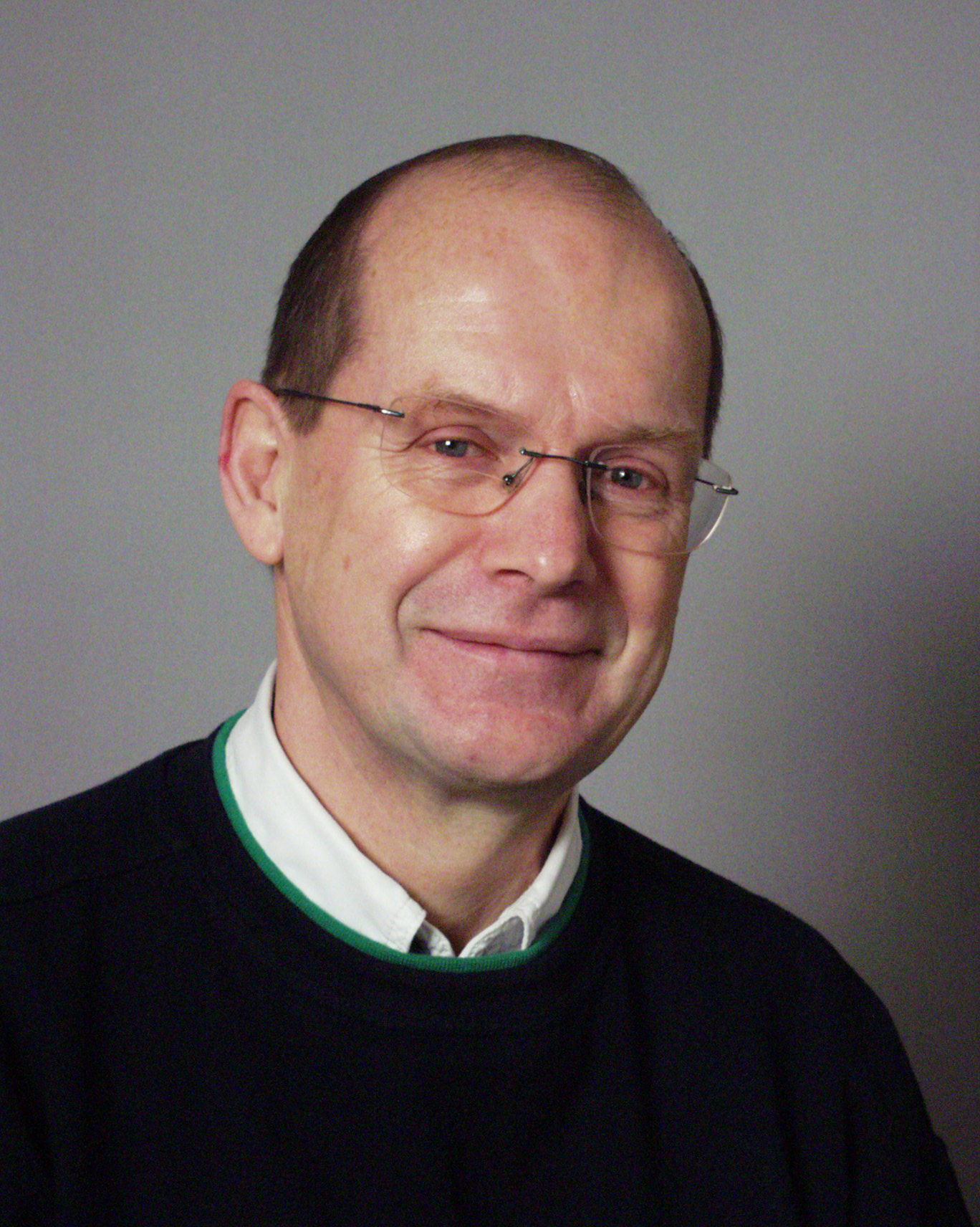
- Born: July 25, 1942 (age 84); Detmold
- Citizenship: German
- Scientific career
- Fields: Anatomy, MRI, Neuroradiology, Neurosciences
- Workplaces: Max Planck Institute for Biological Cybernetics

Wolfgang Grodd (born 25 July 1942 in Detmold, Germany) is a German neuroradiologist and professor emeritus of the university hospital at the University of Tübingen. He is known for his scientific works on the development and application of structural and functional magnetic resonance imaging in metabolic diseases, sensorimotor representation, language production, and cognitive processing, cerebellum, thalamus, and basal ganglia. He is a research scientist at the Department of the High-Field MR at the Max Planck Institute for Biological Cybernetics.

== Early life, family and education ==
He served as a temporary soldier in the German Army from 1959 to 1964 and trained as an electronics technician. He subsequently obtained his Abitur (high school diploma) in 1968 at Westfalen Kolleg in Bielefeld. Thereafter he studied biology from 1968 to 1977 and medicine from 1974 to 1981 at the University of Tübingen. From 1972 to 1975, he was a scholarship holder of the Protestant Student Union Villigst. He received his diploma in biology in 1977 and his license to practice medicine in 1981.

== Career ==
Gross's residency training as a radiologist was at the Medical Radiation Institute of the University of Tübingen (1981–1986). However during that period he held a DFG research fellowship at the Department of Radiology at the University of San Francisco (1984–1985).

In 1987, he initially moved to the Department of Neuroradiology at the University of Tübingen as a consultant, where he worked as a senior physician from 1991 to 1995. In 1991, he habilitated in the field of radiology/neuroradiology on the topic of experimental and clinical investigations of volume-selective proton spectroscopy of the human brain, and in the same year he was granted a teaching license in the field of neuroradiology. The following year, Grodd was appointed Professor of Neuroradiology at the Steglitz Clinic of the Free University of Berlin, but he declined. From 1995, he was professor and head of the scientific section Experimental Nuclear Magnetic Resonance of the Central Nervous System at the University Hospital of Tübingen, where he gave his farewell lecture in 2010. Grodd is at the Department High-field Magnetic Resonance at the Max Planck Institute for Biological Cybernetics.

== Scientific focus ==
- Clinical use of proton spectroscopy
- Maturation, abnormalities and metabolic diseases of children's brains
- Functional imaging of fear, sociopathy, humour and laughing
- Memory performance in Alzheimer's disease and dementia
- Language processing and speech production
- Functional anatomy of cerebellum and thalamus.
- Using functional magnetic resonance imaging (fMRI), Grodd was able to demonstrate somatotopic activation areas for the motor activities of lips, tongue, hands and feet in the cortex of the cerebellum.
- Cognitive processing of visual processes

== Awards ==
For his scientific research activity, Grodd was awarded the Kurt-Decker Award of the German Society for Neuroradiology in 1988, 1989, 1992 and in 1998. In 1989 the German Society for Neurotraumatology honored him for his outstanding scientific work.

Dr. Grodd was ranked 463 globally and 33 in Germany in research.com’s 2023 Ranking of Best Scientists in Neuroscience. The same year, they granted him the Neuroscience Leader Award.

== Memberships in scientific organizations ==
Grodd is a member of various national and international scientific organizations:

- International Society of Magnetic Resonance in Medicine (1988— )
- European Society of Magnetic Resonance in Medicine and Biology (1988— )
- Organization for Human Brain Mapping (1996— )
- American Society of Advancement of Science (1998— )
- German Society of Clinical Neurophysiology (2000— )
- Society for Neuroscience (2001— )

== Publications ==
Grodd is the author and co-author of over 280 publications in neuroscientific journals and 26 chapters in monographs and books.

- List of publications: Wolfgang Grodd, ResearchGate
- List of publications: Wolfgang Grodd, PubMed
- List of publications: Wolfgang Grodd, Loop
