= Solarroller =

Solarroller is a BEAM dragster photovore robot run by solar panel that utilizes sunlight. In competitions between solarrollers, each one must run one meter in the shortest time possible. Components include pager motors, capacitors, resistors, transistors, and solar panels.

There are several different kinds of configurations of solarrollers, with bigger or smaller wheels, one or two motors. Configurations differences include:

- motor (number and output),
- wheels (number and size), and
- frame designs

This robot type always moves forwards. The motor drives one or more wheels. A "Solar Engine" circuit is used to feed the robot. Solarroller's speed is directly related to the amount of light robot registers on its optical sensor. Most are driven by an electronic "relaxation oscillator", in which a charge is accumulated in a capacitor while at rest and then suddenly released in the drive mechanism.

== See also ==
- Mark Tilden

== External articles ==
- Solarbotics.net gallery of Solarrollers
- BEAM robotics Yahoo! group
- Beam-Online sollarrolers gallery with several different configurations
- 2003 BEAM SolarRoller Race, robotgames.net
- Solarrollers on the BEAM Wiki
