= Analog robot =

An analog robot is a type of robot which uses analog circuitry to go toward a simple goal such as finding more light or responding to sound. The first real analog robot was invented in the 1940s by William Grey Walter. The name of these robots were Elmer and Elsie (ELectroMEchanical Robot, Light-Sensitive). The original circuitry was developed using two vacuum tubes and a photocell to search and follow a light. Recently a kind of analog robots was developed by Mark Tilden.

Some modern analog robots are BEAM robots. Braitenberg Vehicles (described by Valentino Braitenberg) also are frequently analog, consisting of the output of sensors connected to motors without any form of signal processing.

== See also ==
- Analog computer
