= Braitenberg vehicle =

Autonomous cybernetic agent

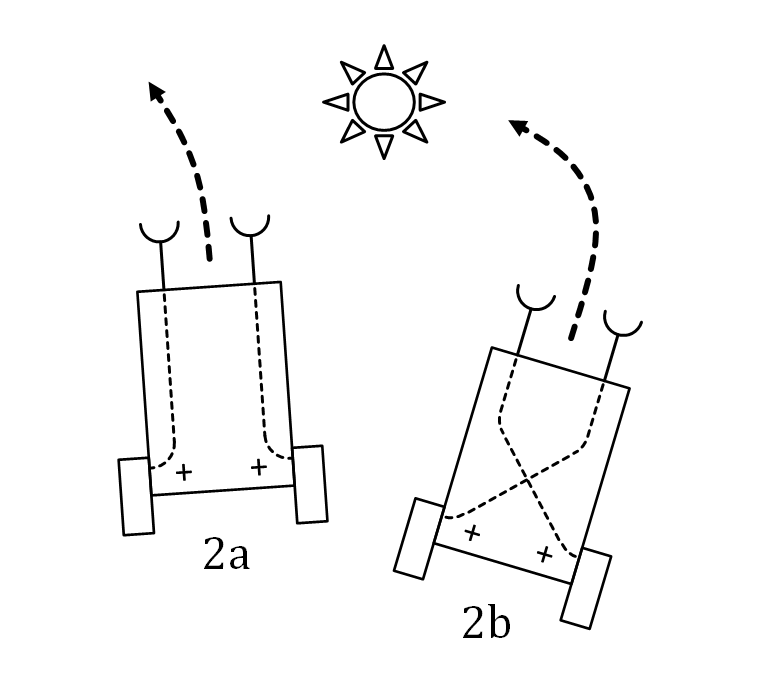
Vehicles 2a, 2b

A Braitenberg vehicle is an imaginary robot or creature used as the subject of a thought experiment to study embodied cognition. It was introduced by the Italian cyberneticist Valentino Braitenberg in his 1984 book Vehicles: Experiments in Synthetic Psychology. In the thought experiment, a vehicle equipped with sensors and actuators moves through a hypothetical environment, where orienting behaviors such as pursuit or avoidance are achieved by differential steering based on sensory input. A researcher may then analyze the vehicle's behavior to better understand how it relates to the wiring. Braitenberg presented fourteen vehicle types of increasing complexity, from simple creatures that demonstrate phototaxis to complex creatures that show behavior suggestive of psychological phenomena, such the formation of concepts and generation of ideas. The thought experiment has been used in neuroscience, artificial life, and robotics, in simulated and real environments.

== Overview ==
A Braitenberg vehicle is an autonomous agent that moves through its environment based on sensory input. Its locomotion behavior is determined by the pattern of wiring that connects its sensors, such as light or odor sensors, to the actuators, often imagined or realized as wheels. In an environment with multiple stimuli, a vehicle can exhibit complex and dynamic behavior. Depending on the connections between sensors and actuators, it might move close to a source, but not touch it, run away very fast, or make circles or figures-of-eight around a point. Vehicles can be considered singly in their environment, or as part of a multi-agent system.

=== Uses ===
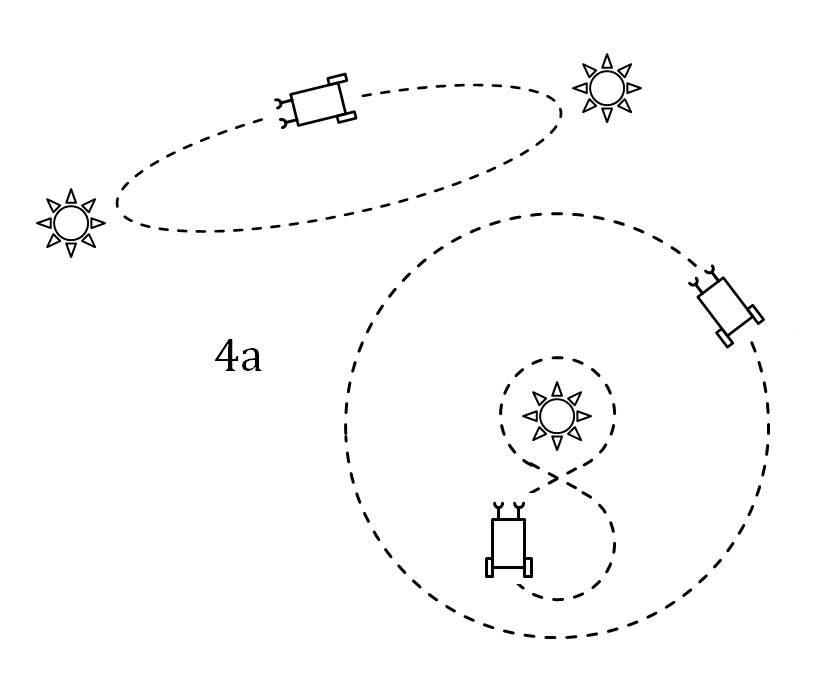
Complex behavior

Braitenberg vehicles have been incorporated into a variety of fields of research, such as robotics, artificial life, and neuroscience. Robotics researchers have used the idea to develop robots that can autonomously orient toward or away from stimuli such as odor and sound, such as in path planning. In neuroscience, vehicles have been used to better understand how animals navigate, including chemotaxis in fruit flies and cockroaches, and phonotaxis in lizards, salamanders, and bats, and have been compared to the nervous systems of ciliated larvae. Vehicles have also been used as a teaching tool, and in simulation games.

Artificial life researcher Seth Bullock argued that Braitenberg's approach, starting with construction and experimentation rather than analysis, can make understanding behavior easier: "Tinkering with the systems in order to achieve some interesting behaviour is far easier than analysing these systems to determine why a particular configuration of sensors, wires, and motors gives rise to the particular behaviour that it does." But he also noted that an intuitive simulation model may introduce its own analytical requirements.

Cognitive scientist and philosopher Daniel Dennett described Braitenberg's early vehicle types as "comically simple", and argued that adding to the vehicle and elaborating on its design is "a process that fruitfully echoes evolution by natural selection and yields many insights into the historical and structural constraints on design-development in living things." Cybernetician Michael A. Arbib called Braitenberg's process of tinkering "ad hoc evolution", to distinguish it from evolution by natural selection, genetic algorithms, and conceptual neural evolution.

=== History ===
The ideas presented in Vehicles had their origins in previous work. As a neuroanatomist, Braitenberg studied the cerebellum to understand its role in complex timing behaviors such as humans playing music. He took a particular interest in decussation, or the crossing of nerve fibers, as it relates to taxis and kinesis behaviors. Early ideas were expressed in a 1965 paper almost 20 years prior to the book, where he speculated that decussation in vertebrate brains may be due to an ancestor that used olfactory taxes. He also focused on symmetries in neuroanatomy, including in visual cortex and rat barrel cortex. In a 1977 paper, Braitenberg credited German mathematician Hermann Weyl's 1952 book Symmetry as influential in forming his ideas.

== Original formulations ==
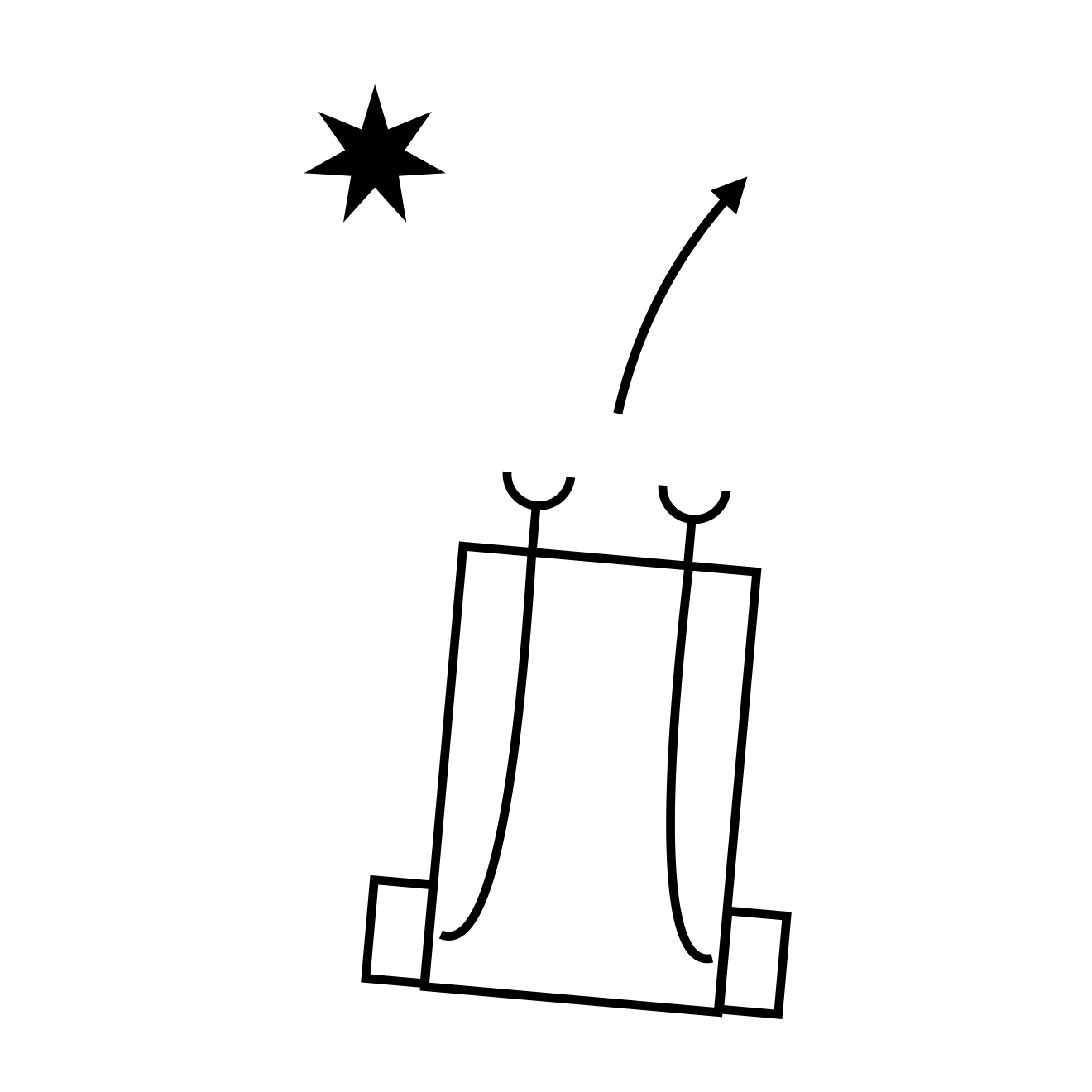
Vehicle Type 2a "Fear". Ipsilateral, excitatory connections cause the vehicle to turn away from the stimulus quickly.

Braitenberg outlined 14 types of vehicles, in increasing complexity, and deliberately used cognitive and psychological terms when describing their behaviors. For example, Vehicle 1 illustrates a 1-dimensional creature that responds to a simple stimulus by moving forward, akin to kinesis. Vehicles 2a, 2b, 3a, and 3b exemplify the 4 main ways vehicles navigate their environment, usually the basis for behavioral observation and analysis. These vehicle types introduce taxis. Subsequent vehicles elaborate on these basic principles, including hardware upgrades and more complex connections between sensors and actuators.

=== Vehicle 1 ===
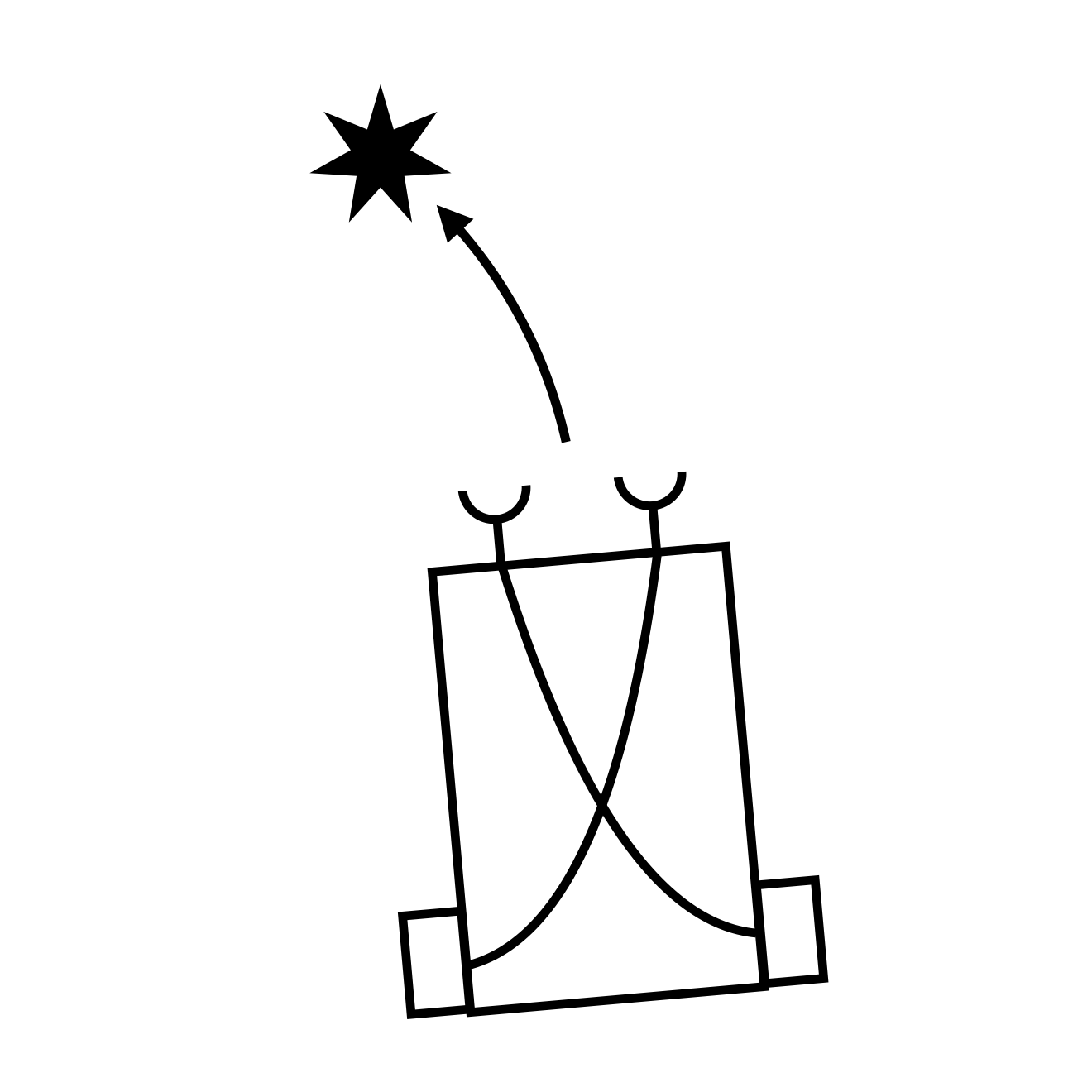
Vehicle Type 2b "Aggression". Contralateral, excitatory connections cause the vehicle to turn toward the stimulus and approach with increasing speed.

In Braitenberg's simplest configuration, a temperature sensor is connected directly to the vehicle's only wheel. Any temperature above absolute zero activates the sensor, which in turn activates the wheel, pushing the vehicle forward. As the temperature increases, so does the wheel's speed. The resulting behavior of this vehicle is that it moves along a straight line. However, asymmetrical frictional forces can cause the vehicle to deviate from its straight line motion in unpredictable ways akin to Brownian motion. To a human observer, this creature might appear 'alive' and 'restless', never stopping in its movement. The low speed in regions of low temperature might be interpreted as a preference for cold areas.

=== Vehicles 2 and 3 ===
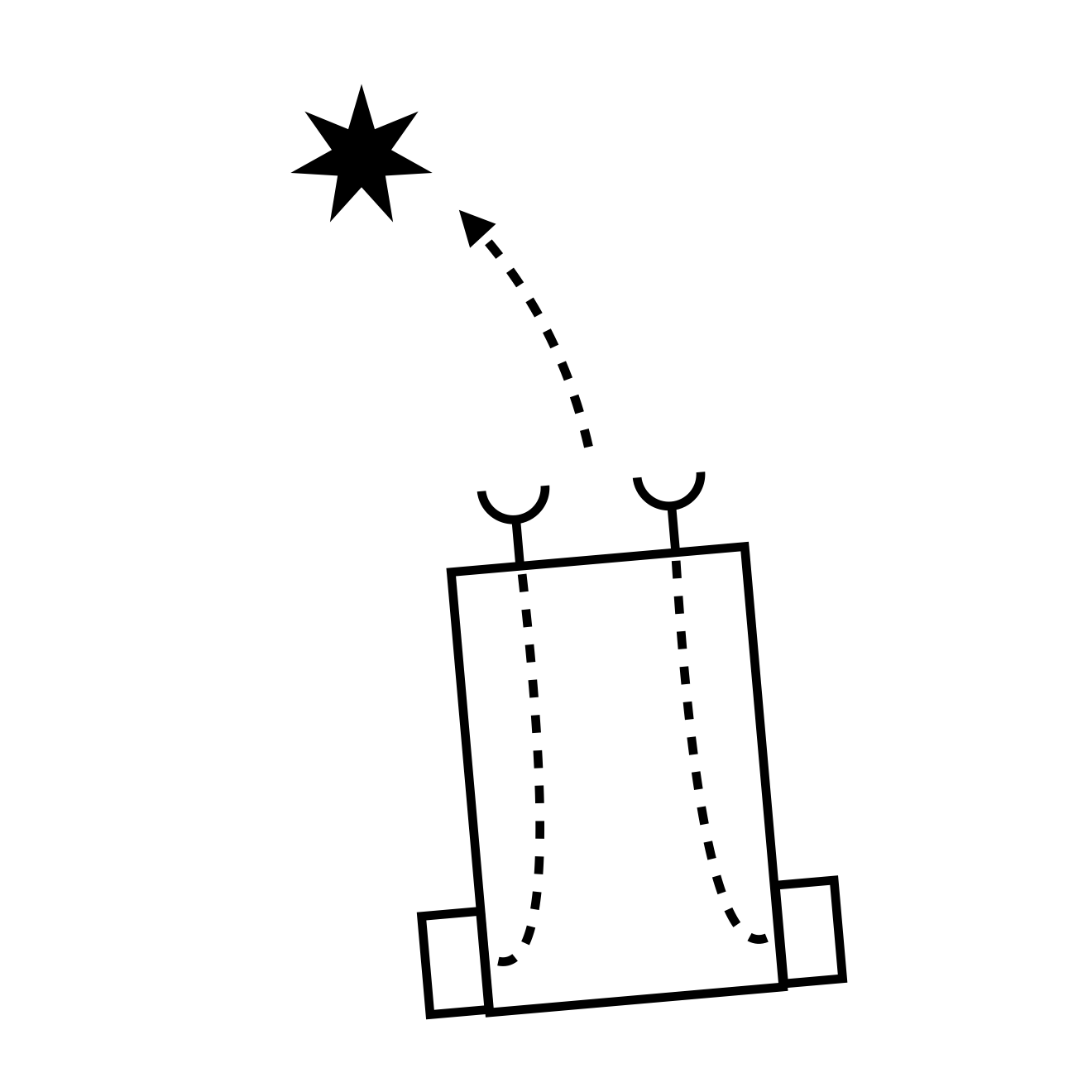
Vehicle Type 3a "Love". Ipsilateral, inhibitory connections cause the vehicle to turn toward the stimulus and approach gently.

More complex vehicle types include two sensors and two wheels in a body with bilateral symmetry, capable of taxis via differential steering. Braitenberg imagined a vehicle that has left and right sensors at the front of the body, and left and right wheels at the rear. This design presents four possible wiring configurations depending on whether the wires are connected ipsilaterally (same side) or contralaterally (crossed), and whether the connections are excitatory (increase wheel activation) or inhibitory (decrease wheel activation). In this class of vehicles, differential steering plays the key role. When the intensity of the stimulus is greater in one sensor than in the other, one wheel will be driven at a higher speed than the other, causing the vehicle to turn. The 4 wiring configurations were named by Braitenberg to capture the psychology the vehicles appeared to him to be demonstrating: fear, aggression, love, and exploration.

==== Type 2a: Fear ====
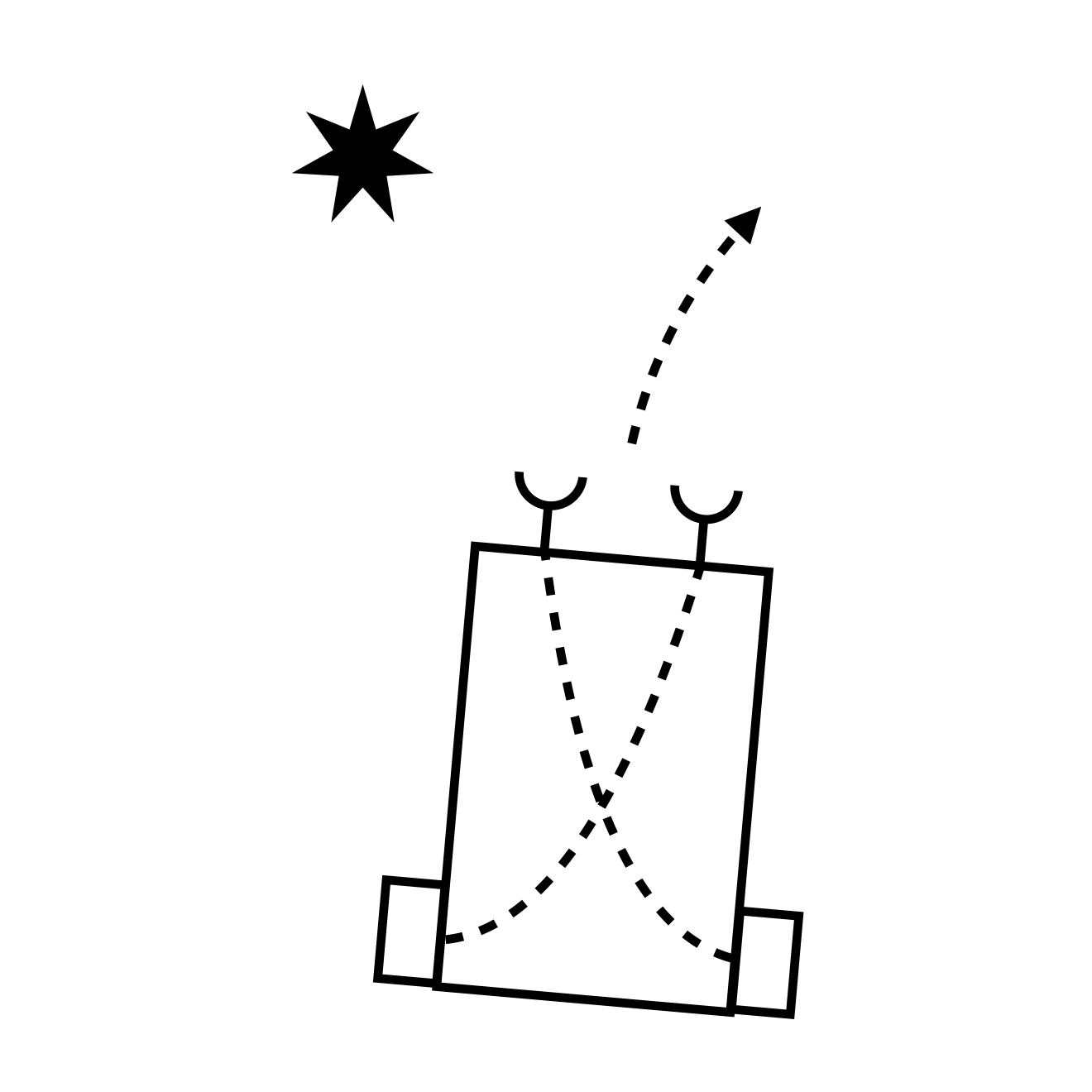
Vehicle Type 3b "Exploration". Contralateral, inhibitory connections cause the vehicle to turn away from the stimulus slowly, then accelerate away.

In vehicles of Type 2a, the two sensors and two wheels are connected by ipsilateral excitatory wires. If a stimulus is located in front of the vehicle and to its left, it will activate both of the vehicle's sensors, but unequally; the left sensor is closer to the stimulus and will therefore be activated more strongly. This increased activation leads to increased activation in both wheels, but unequally; the left wheel is activated more strongly than the right. Thus the vehicle turns to the right, suggesting to Braitenberg that it "fears" the stimulus.

==== Type 2b: Aggression ====
In vehicles of Type 2b, the excitatory wires are crossed. Thus greater activation in the left sensor activates the right wheel more strongly than the left and vice versa. As a result, the vehicle turns toward the stimulus, and accelerates as it approaches it. Braitenberg imagined that this behavior showed an attack on the stimulus.

==== Type 3a: Love ====
In vehicles of Type 3a, the connections are ipsilateral and inhibitory. Considering the example of a stimulus in front of the vehicle and to its left, the same-side inhibition causes the left wheel to slow down more than the right wheel. Thus the vehicle turns to the left - toward the stimulus - but approaches gently. To Braitenberg, this suggested love.

==== Type 3b: Exploration ====
In vehicles of Type 3b, inhibitory wires are crossed. When a stimulus is presented in front of the creature off to the left, greater activation in the left sensor inhibits the right wheel more strongly than the left. As a result, the vehicle turns to the right. Due to inhibition, it moves slowly when near a stimulus before accelerating away, as if in "search" of the next stimulus. Braitenberg called this vehicle the explorer.

=== More complex vehicles ===
The subsequent vehicle types in the original formulation introduced new hardware and wiring, such as a compound eye, new types of wires, and nonlinearities in the stimulus-motor activation such as non-monotonicity and sensory thresholding. Delay circuits, constructed with a battery of sensors in a line, make the vehicle capable of motion detection. More complex arrangements make possible scale-invariant object detection, prediction, and learning. Based on their behavior, Braitenberg ascribes qualities to these vehicles, such as values, egotism, and optimism. He speculates that these vehicles could be capable of logic, concepts, ideas, and trains of thought.

== Extensions ==
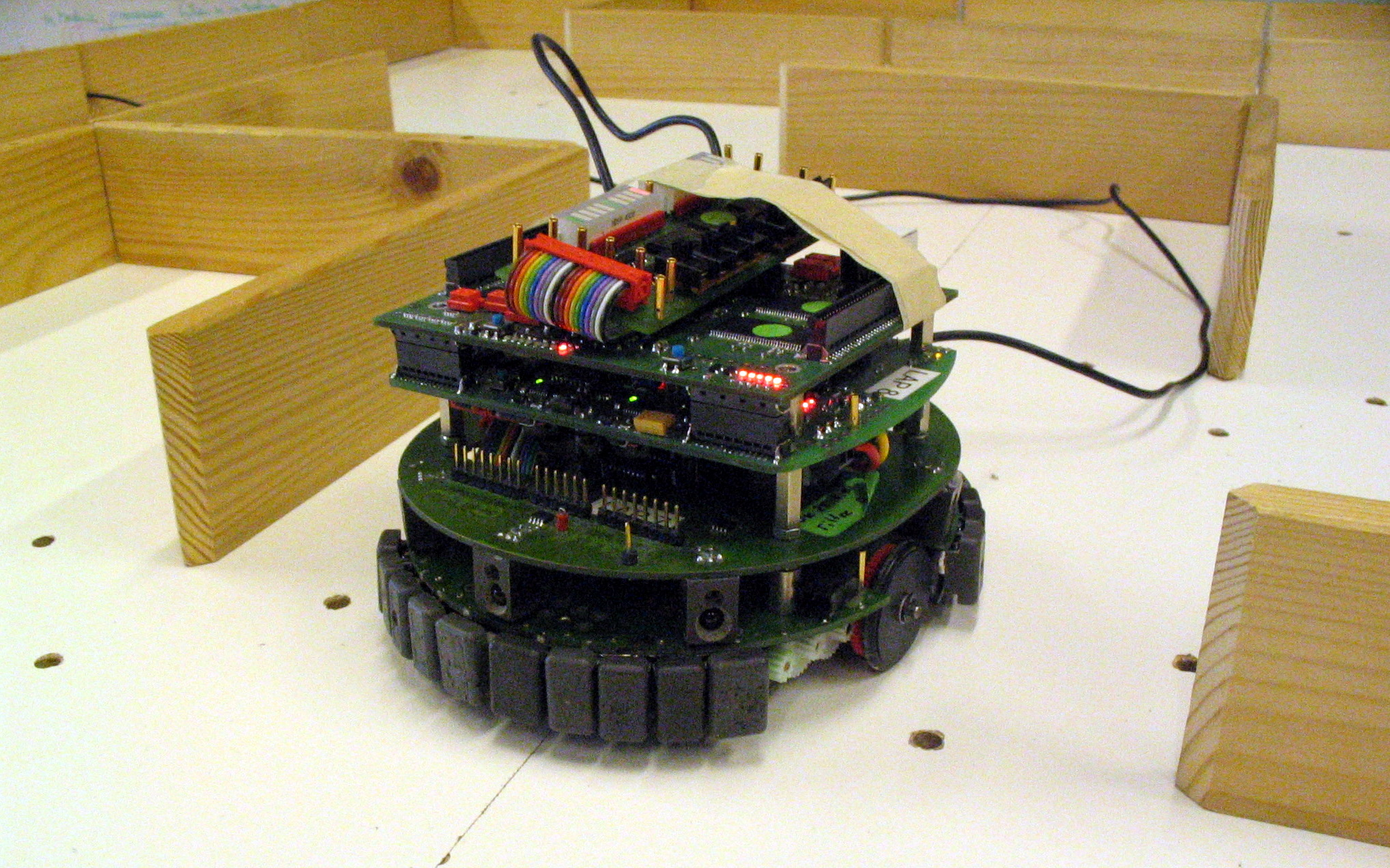
"Cyclope" robot moving with Braitenberg-style activation rules

4 minute video of a Braitenberg vehicle avoiding obstacles

The vehicle idea has been extended by researchers across many fields. Theoretical work has put the vehicle concept into a mathematical framework. Researchers have also built and studied multi-agent systems, such as pairs and larger systems. In robotics, the idea has been realized in many variants, including molecular robotics.

=== Theory ===
Vehicles have been considered in mathematical frameworks. In their 2024 book The Open Dynamics of Braitenberg Vehicles, Scott Hotton and Jeff Yoshimi apply dynamical systems theory and numerical analysis to study pairs of vehicles sense each other along with the environment. They described "moving" attractors for behavior, which they called paths, that change with changes in the environment. Attractors had previously been used to explain the trajectories of vehicle Type 3a, and Vehicles 2 and 3 have been considered as a dynamical system. The Braitenberg idea has also been combined with integrated information measures and simulated evolution. In one study, Vehicles 2a, 2b, 3a, and 3b were evaluated for fitness after undergoing a selection process in which each gene was a set of connectivity weights in the vehicle's neural network. The researchers noted that this approach allowed them to study integrated information using relatively simple agents.

=== Robotics ===
A wide variety of real-world vehicles have been developed. These robots vary by their sensors, actuators, and approaches for wiring. Materials vary as well; vehicle-inspired robots have been constructed from materials such as Memristive wires and molecules. The physicality of the robots can influence the interpretation of behavior. For example, Koh Hosoda described a type of Braitenberg vehicle called a Swiss Robot, invented by artificial intelligence researcher Rolf Pfeifer based on the Vehicle 2 architecture, as displaying "tidying-up" behavior that is an emergent property of the system, different from Braitenberg's description of these vehicle types as fearful or aggressive.

Neuromorphic robots use complex, brain-inspired wiring patterns. To test whether a robot can complete a path following task using visual familiarity alone, researchers developed a type of Braitenberg vehicle whose neural architecture is based on an insect mushroom body, noted for its ability to learn associations, and it includes vehicle-style sensory-difference-based steering. Here, however, the vehicle is driven by differing familiarity measures arising from the two inputs, instead of differences in simple olfactory or visual stimuli as in Braitenberg's early examples. These results were achieved in both simulated and real robots. Similar results have been achieved in a related familiarity-based navigation task.

The vehicle idea has been applied to molecular robotics as well. Researchers created an analogue of a Type 2a vehicle in an "amoeba-type" molecular robot. This vehicle used one frequency of light as a "positive" signal and a different frequency as a "negative" signal, each of which, through a metabolic pathway, caused a protein to "walk" along a microtubule, forming the basis for its taxis behavior.

== See also ==
- Analog robot
- BEAM robotics
- Turtle (robot)
- Electric unicycle
