= Neuropod cell =

Gut sensory epithelial cell that synapses with neurons

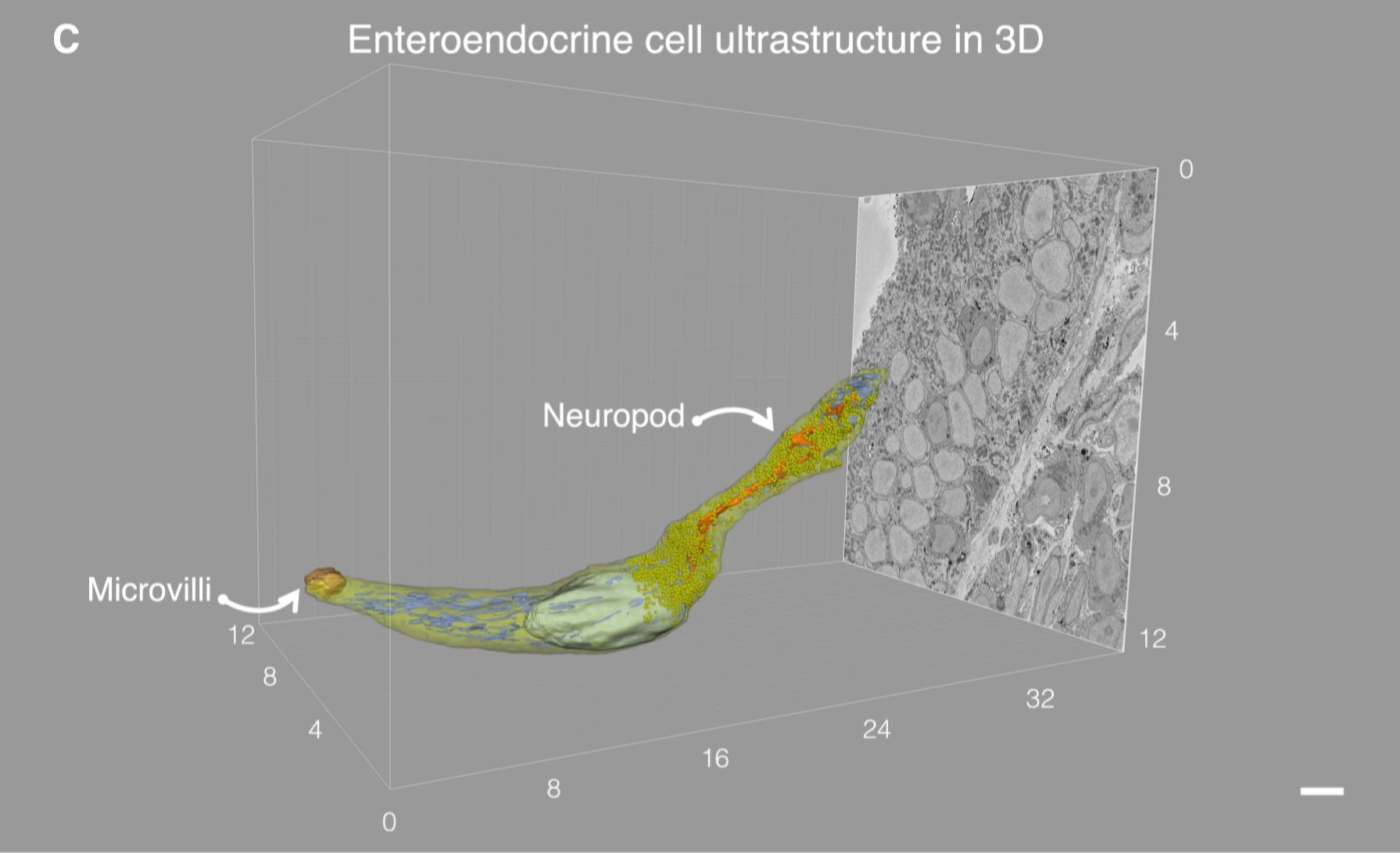
Three-dimensional reconstruction of a neuropod cell from a serial block-face scanning electron microscopy dataset. The left side of the cell bears microvilli extending into the gut lumen; the right side bears a neuropod extending toward the lamina propria.

Neuropod cells are sensory epithelial cells of the intestine that form synapses with neurons, allowing the gut to signal the brain in milliseconds. The term is functional rather than molecular or structural: it identifies enteroendocrine cells acting as sensory transducers, converting stimuli from the gut lumen into neural signals. Though synaptic contact with nerve fibers does not require a neuropod, the cells are named for that structure: an axon-like basal process described in 2011 and named in 2014. Through these synapses the gut senses its own contents — nutrients, microbes, and other stimuli — and conveys them to the brain by the fastest route known. Because the signal arrives while a meal is still under way, it can shape behavior in real time: neuropod cells distinguish sugar from non-caloric sweeteners, and that discrimination, made in the intestine rather than on the tongue, drives the preference for sugar. They also sense the microbiota directly, detecting the bacterial protein flagellin in the colon through TLR5 and suppressing food intake — a capacity described in 2025 as a neurobiotic sense.

Enteroendocrine cells had long been established as the source of the hormonal signals that reach the brain from the intestine; the gut was the tissue in which the first hormone, secretin, was identified in 1902. On this model, communication was chemical and diffuse: secreted peptides pass through the lamina propria to reach intrinsic or extrinsic neurons, or enter the circulation to act on distant target tissues, over seconds to minutes. The synapse made the link anatomical.

Basal processes on gut endocrine cells were described from 1979 onward and read at the time as a paracrine route. They were characterized as axon-like in 2011, named neuropods in 2014, and shown in 2015 to form synapses with nerves; the cells were named for that sensory role in 2018.

These findings established synaptic transmission as a mechanism of gut sensation, extending the gut–brain axis beyond hormonal signaling and opening a field of research in sensory neurobiology. Distinct senses have since been described for nutrients, for mechanical force, and for microbial signals, the last termed the neurobiotic sense. The cells also guide the development of the vagal network that carries their signals, and their signaling has been linked to visceral pain and to mood.

== Structure ==
Neuropod cells sit within the intestinal epithelium, with a narrow apical surface bearing microvilli exposed to the lumen and a single basal process — the neuropod — extending beneath the epithelium toward the lamina propria. The neuropod contains neurofilaments, structural proteins characteristic of axons, and holds the majority of the cell's peptide-secreting vesicles. Processes reaching up to 50 μm in length have been described. Enteric glia contact these basal processes, and nerve fibers connect to the cells through the neuropod. Serotonergic enterochromaffin cells are electrically excitable, generating rapid inward currents on stimulation.

== History ==
Long basal cytoplasmic processes on gut endocrine cells were described decades before the term neuropod existed. In 1979, somatostatin-containing cells of the gastrointestinal tract were found to bear long non-luminal processes terminating on other cell types, including gastrin-producing and acid-producing cells; the authors interpreted these as pathways for paracrine secretion, and noted that other gut endocrine cells have similar prolongations. An ultrastructural study of the rat ileal mucosa reported a synapse in the same year. A 1985 study of the mouse duodenum found basal extensions of enterochromaffin cells contacting or passing through the basal lamina but saw no synaptic contacts on those cells; a synaptic contact between a neurite and a different type of enteroendocrine cell led the authors to propose a neurocrine role for some basally granulated cells. Enterochromaffin cells and their processes were visualized again in the rat in 2006, and in 2010 pseudopod-like basal processes were described in intestinal cholecystokinin cells, extending almost exclusively to neighbouring enterocytes and again interpreted as a route for paracrine secretion. Across this work the processes were read as pathways for local secretion rather than as connections to nerves.

Enteroendocrine cells were also shown to be electrically active. In 2003, glucose-triggered secretion from an L-cell line was found to depend both on closure of ATP-sensitive potassium channels and on an inward current generated by electrogenic sugar transport through sodium–glucose cotransporters, which increased action potential frequency. Primary L cells were subsequently shown to be electrically excitable and glucose responsive, with secretion regulated by SGLT1 and ATP-sensitive potassium channels, and the voltage-gated ion channels coupling nutrient detection to hormone release were characterized in 2011.

Processes reaching up to 50 μm in length, extending toward the lamina propria, were characterized in 2011, and described later that year as axon-like. The term neuropod was coined in 2014 by Diego V. Bohórquez and colleagues, who used serial block-face electron microscopy to reconstruct these cells in three dimensions and found that 73.5% of their peptide-secreting vesicles were concentrated in a single neurofilament-bearing basal process. In 2015, the same group showed that these cells form synaptic connections with nerves in the mucosa of the rodent small and large intestine. In 2017, serotonergic enterochromaffin cells studied in intestinal organoids were shown to be electrically excitable and to modulate serotonin-sensitive primary afferent fibers through synaptic connections, extending synaptic transduction to a second epithelial cell type. In 2018 the term was extended to the cells themselves, naming them for that sensory role.

The connection was established with a modified rabies virus lacking the glycoprotein required to cross synapses: delivered into the colon it infected enteroendocrine cells and spread no further, whereas in mice engineered to supply that glycoprotein in the same cells it crossed a single synapse and labelled the connecting nerve fibers. Restricting viral entry to enteroendocrine cells alone traced the circuit from the intestinal lumen to vagal nodose neurons and onward to the nucleus tractus solitarius of the brainstem. The connected neurons originate in the dorsal root ganglia and the vagal nodose ganglion, indicating that luminal stimuli reach the brain within milliseconds of activation. Neuropod cells contain both pre- and postsynaptic proteins, suggesting that information travels in both directions between the epithelium and the nervous system.

== Nutrient sense ==
Neuropod cells give the gut a sense for nutrients, transduced to the brain through neuroepithelial circuits and used to guide appetitive choices. They assess the nutrient content of ingested food by detecting glucose, fatty acids, amino acids, monoacylglycerols, and oligopeptides.

In 2018, neuropod cells of the small intestine were shown to synapse with vagal neurons and to transduce sugar using glutamate, carrying the signal to the brain within milliseconds rather than the seconds to minutes required by hormonal signaling.

Sugar and artificial sweeteners both taste sweet, yet natural sugar is preferred, and mice lacking sweet taste transduction still develop a preference for sugar based on its caloric content alone. This indicates that the gut, rather than the mouth, distinguishes the two and guides the preference. Conditioning to intragastric glucose requires the sodium–glucose cotransporter SGLT1: mice lacking the transporter fail to develop a preference for a flavour paired with glucose.

In duodenal neuropod cells labeled for cholecystokinin, sugar is detected by the electrogenic sodium–glucose cotransporter SGLT1 and sweeteners by the sweet taste receptor T1R3. The two stimuli are then carried by different neurotransmitters to distinct populations of vagal nodose neurons: sugar releases glutamate, sweetener releases ATP. This difference in transmitter is the mechanism by which the gut distinguishes sugar from sweetener.

To test what this contributes to behavior, a flexible fiberoptic was engineered to bring optogenetics to the gut lumen; silencing duodenal neuropod cells reduced the preference for sucrose from 90.8% to 58.9%. Genetic silencing of synaptic activity in the gut-to-brain circuit likewise prevents mice from developing a preference for sugar, and chemogenetic activation of that circuit creates preferences for otherwise less-preferred stimuli. On the resulting model, distinct populations of vagal neurons relay these cues to the nucleus of the solitary tract, to dopaminergic reward circuits of the basal ganglia, and to homeostatic feeding circuits of the hypothalamus, shaping current and future sugar consumption.

== Mechanical sense ==
The epithelium also senses force. A subset of enteroendocrine cells, including serotonergic enterochromaffin cells, is directly mechanosensitive: mechanical stimulation opens Piezo2 channels, producing a rapid inward current and a rise in intracellular calcium that drives serotonin release, and conditional deletion of epithelial Piezo2 reduces mechanically stimulated secretion. The calcium signal is amplified by release from intracellular stores, with ryanodine receptor 3 enriched in these cells relative to neighbouring colonocytes.

== Neurobiotic sense ==
The gut microbiota prime the immune system and support normal function of the central nervous system, as shown in germ-free and gnotobiotic mice, which develop dysregulated immune responses and a range of neurological deficits. In germ-free mice the abundance of chromogranin A-positive cells falls in the ileum and rises in the colon, linking the microbiota to the normal distribution of these cells.

Neuropod cells in humans and mice carry receptors for microbe-associated molecular patterns (MAMPs), including bacterial lipopolysaccharide, and for bacterial metabolites such as short-chain fatty acids. Serotonergic enterochromaffin cells likewise respond to microbial metabolites and relay that information to afferent nerves. They are therefore positioned to detect microbial signals in the gut lumen and relay them to the brain.

This was demonstrated in 2025. Flagellin, the structural protein of the bacterial flagellum and a pattern shared across bacterial phyla, stimulates TLR5 on peptide YY-labelled neuropod cells in the mouse colon, which release peptide YY onto NPY2R-expressing vagal nodose neurons to reduce feeding. Flagellin does not act on the nerve directly; it reaches the neuropod cells from the colonic lumen, and its effect is independent of immune responses, metabolic change, and the presence of a microbiota. Mice lacking TLR5 in these cells eat more and gain more weight than controls. Because it allows the host to adjust its behavior in real time to a molecular pattern from its resident microorganisms, this was named the neurobiotic sense, a sense at the interface between the biota and the brain.

Pathogens also act on these cells. Chlamydia trachomatis has been implicated in the pathogenesis of irritable bowel syndrome through direct infection of neuropod cells and upregulation of neurotransmitter transporters, including those for glutamate. Infection with the helminth Trichinella spiralis causes a marked reduction in food intake that depends on the presence and abundance of neuropod cells. Together these findings indicate that microbes can act on neuropod cells and, through them, influence the host's nervous system and behavior.

== Development ==
Neuropod cells also shape the vagal network that carries their signals. In zebrafish, vagal sensory fibers begin to innervate the intestine two days after fertilization and branch toward newly formed enteroendocrine cells, which extend actin filaments at their base and physically engage the arriving fibers. Removing these cells impairs formation of the intestinal vagal network, abolishes the brain's response to ingested nutrients, and increases food intake.

== Gut-to-brain transfer ==
The rabies tracing that revealed the circuit also showed that it can carry a pathogen: a virus introduced into the lumen of the colon reached the brainstem by crossing a single synapse from a neuropod cell onto a vagal neuron.

In Parkinson's disease, misfolded α-synuclein appears in enteric nerves before it appears in the brain, suggesting that the pathology begins in the gut and spreads to the central nervous system by prion-like propagation from cell to cell. α-Synuclein is expressed in neuropod cells of the mouse and human intestine, and those cells connect directly to α-synuclein-containing nerves; on this basis it was proposed that influences in the gut lumen could alter α-synuclein folding in the epithelium and begin its propagation toward the brain. Gut mucosal cells have since been shown to transfer α-synuclein to the vagus nerve.

== Visceral pain and mood ==
Guanylyl cyclase C (GUCY2C), an intestinal receptor that regulates luminal fluid secretion and is the target of approved drugs for chronic constipation, is selectively enriched in neuropod cells in mice and humans. GUCY2C-expressing neuropod cells associate with cocultured dorsal root ganglion neurons and render them hyperexcitable, lowering the rheobase and increasing the number of evoked action potentials; the GUCY2C agonist linaclotide eliminates that hyperexcitability in GUCY2C-sufficient but not GUCY2C-deficient cells, independently of bulk epithelial cells or extracellular cGMP. Deleting GUCY2C from neuropod cells alone amplifies nociceptive signaling and produces visceral pain that does not respond to linaclotide, indicating that these drugs act analgesically through neuropod cells.

Serotonergic enterochromaffin cells contribute to the same pathway. Enhancing their activity in mice is sufficient to elicit hypersensitivity to gut distension, and their function is necessary for sensitization by isovalerate, a bacterial short-chain fatty acid associated with gastrointestinal inflammation. Prolonged activation produced persistent visceral hypersensitivity in the absence of any inflammatory episode, and perturbing these cells promoted anxiety-like behaviour that normalized when serotonergic signalling was blocked. Sex differences were observed across several paradigms, indicating that the circuit is tonically engaged in females.

Epithelial serotonin also influences affective behaviour. Deleting the serotonin reuptake transporter selectively from the intestinal epithelium of mice produced anxiolytic and antidepressant-like effects without adverse gastrointestinal or central effects, whereas inhibiting epithelial serotonin synthesis increased anxiety- and depression-like behaviour; vagal afferent pathways were identified as the route by which epithelial serotonin affects behaviour.
