= Max Planck Institute for Biological Cybernetics =

Institute in Germany

Coordinates: 48°32′12″N 9°3′32″E

The Max Planck Institute for Biological Cybernetics is located in Tübingen, Baden-Württemberg, Germany. It is one of 80 institutes in the Max Planck Society (Max Planck Gesellschaft). It was founded in 1968.

The institute is studying signal and information processing in the brain. We know that our brain is constantly processing a vast amount of sensory and intrinsic information by which our behavior is coordinated accordingly. How the brain actually achieves these tasks is less well understood, for example, how it perceives, recognizes, and learns new objects. The scientists at the Max Planck Institute for Biological Cybernetics aim to determine which signals and processes are responsible for creating a coherent percept of our environment and for eliciting the appropriate behavior. Scientists of several departments and research groups are working towards answering fundamental questions about processing in the brain, using different approaches and methods.

== Departments ==
- Department for Computational Neuroscience (Peter Dayan)
- Department for Body-Brain Cybernetics (Ivan De Araujo)
- Department for Sensory and Sensorimotor Systems (Zhaoping Li)
- Department for High-field Magnetic Resonance (Klaus Scheffler)

== Max Planck Research Groups ==
- Brain States for Plasticity (Svenja Brodt)
- Cognitive Neuroscience & Neurotechnology (Romy Lorenz)
- Dynamic Cognition Group (Assaf Breska)
- Molecular Singaling (Robert Ohlendorf)
- Systems Neuroscience & Neuroengineering (Jennifer Li & Drew Robson)
- Translational Sensory and Circadian Neuroscience (Manuel Spitschan)

== Former departments ==
- Department for Physiology of Cognitive Processes (Nikos Logothetis)
- Department for Human Perception, Cognition and Action (Heinrich H. Bülthoff)
- Empirical Inference (Bernhard Schölkopf)
- Information Processing in Insects (Werner E. Reichardt)
- Structure & Function of Natural Nerve-Net (Valentin von Braitenberg)
