= Valentino Braitenberg =

Italian neuroscientist and cyberneticist

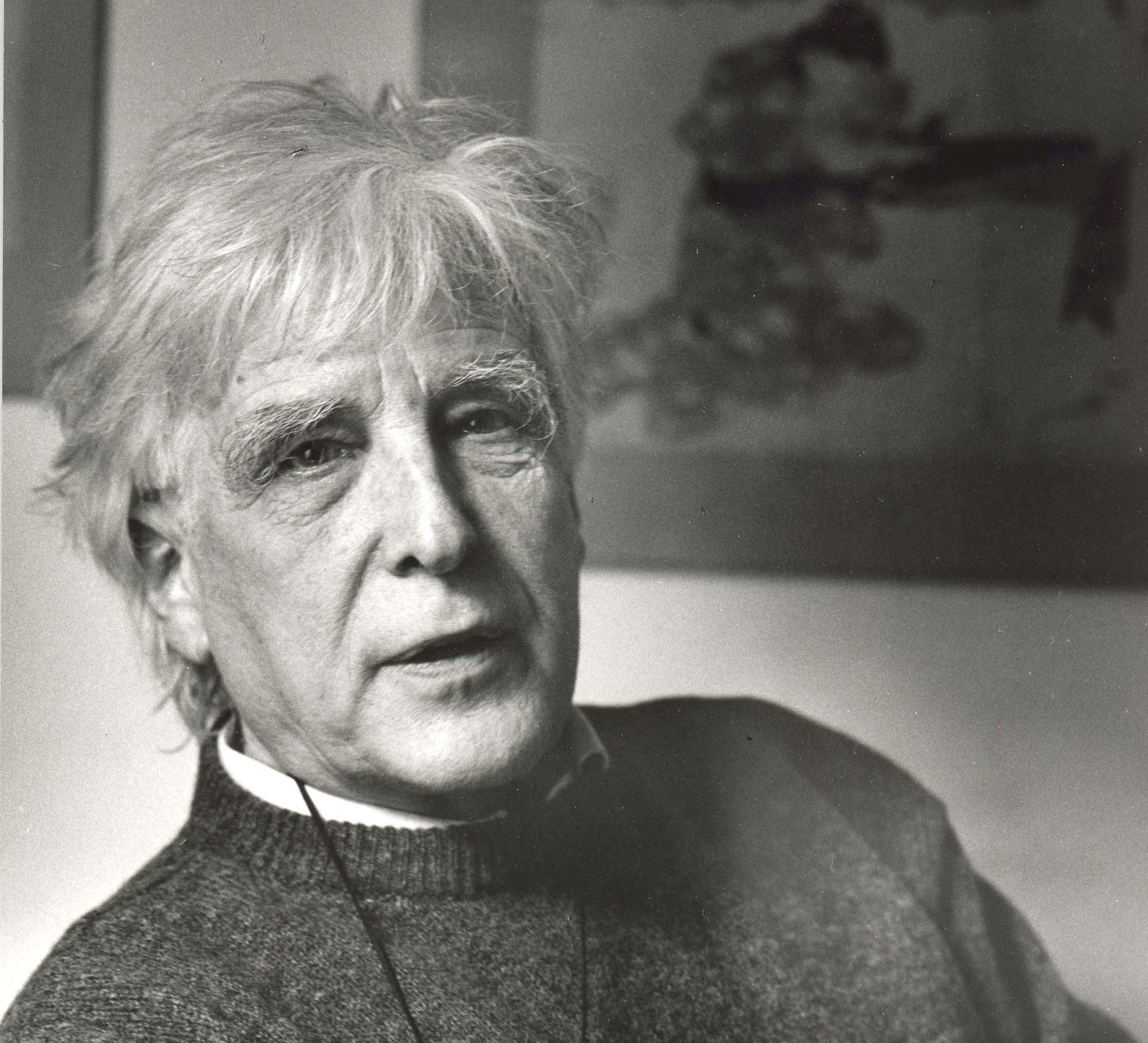
- Valentino Braitenberg
- Born: Valentino Braitenberg; June 18, 1926; Bolzano, South Tyrol, Italy
- Died: September 9, 2011 (aged 85); Tübingen, Germany
- Education: University of Innsbruck; University of Rome
- Known for: Braitenberg Vehicles
- Scientific career
- Fields: Neuroscience, cybernetics
- Workplaces: University of Naples; Max Planck Institute for Biological Cybernetics; University of Trento
- Academic advisors: Oskar Vogt; Karl Kleist
- Doctoral students: Christof Koch; Tobias Bonhoeffer
- Other notable students: José-Antonio Campos-Ortega

Valentino Braitenberg (or Valentin von Braitenberg; 18 June 1926 – 9 September 2011) was an Italian neuroscientist and cyberneticist. He was a former director at the Max Planck Institute for Biological Cybernetics in Tübingen, Germany.

His book Vehicles: Experiments in Synthetic Psychology became famous in Robotics and among Psychologists, in which he described how hypothetical analog vehicles (a combination of sensors, actuators and their interconnections), though simple in design, can exhibit behaviors akin to aggression, love, foresight, and optimism. These have come to be known as Braitenberg vehicles. His pioneering scientific work was concerned with the relationship between structures and functions of the brain.

== Life ==
Valentino Braitenberg grew up in the province of South Tyrol. Braitenberg's father was Senator Carl von Braitenberg, a member of the South Tyrolean nobility.

Since the age of 6, Braitenberg grew up bilingual in the two languages Italian and German. German was spoken at home and all schooling was Italian, conforming to the historic context. The humanistic Lyceum-Gymnasium (High school) in Bolzano gave him an excellent classic education including Italian literature. The German literary education was based on the classical writers he found in his extensive home library. In addition, he trained as a violinist at the Conservatorio Claudio Monteverdi in Bolzano and became a talented violinist and violist.

Braitenberg studied medicine and psychiatry at the University of Innsbruck and the University of Rome between 1945 and 1954. He accompanied his studies with chamber music performances with his viola and violin, where he developed a repertoire of violin-piano duos with a colleague. He completed his medical training with an internship at the psychiatric clinic in Rome, where he decided to prefer a scientific career dedicated to the understanding of brain functions. He spent a few years at Yale University in New Haven (USA) when he was invited by Prof. Eduardo Caianiello in 1958 to set up a biocybernetics research group at the Physics Institute of the University of Naples Federico II, the “Laboratorio di Cibernetica”, as part of the National Research Council in Italy (CNR). Between 1958 and 1968 he was adjunct professor of cybernetics at the Physics Institute of the University of Naples. In 1963 Braitenberg earned the Libera docenza in cybernetics and information theory, the title that used to grant access to professorship at Italian universities. From 1968 until his retirement in 1994, he was co-founder and co-director of the Max Planck Institute for Biological Cybernetics in Tübingen and honorary professor at the University of Tübingen and University of Freiburg. After 1994 he was appointed professor at the Specialization School in Scienze Motorie (Motoric Sciences) at the Rovereto branch of the University of Trento. From 1998 to 2001 he was president of the Laboratorio di Scienze Cognitive at the University of Trento in Rovereto.

Braitenberg received an honorary doctorate from the University of Salzburg in 1995.

Braitenberg was married to the painter Elisabeth Hanna. They had three children, Margareta, Carla, and Zeno.

== Works ==
According to Maier (2012), Braitenberg's interest in understanding the brain began in 1948, when he looked for the first time at some human brain tissue under a microscope. He said that although the connections seemed unbelievably complex, Braitenberg eventually realised that computers could serve as a useful model for understanding the brain. She said that he made seminal contributions to understanding the neuroanatomy of the cerebellum, the wiring of the eye of the fly, and the organisation of the human cerebrum.

Braitenberg published more than 180 scientific works during his lifetime, not including abstracts, reprints, translations into different languages, and different editions of some of his works. According to a search of Google Scholar in September 2014, Braitenberg's book, Vehicles: Experiments in synthetic psychology, had received at least 2622 citations.

Books published by Braitenberg include:

- Information – der Geist in der Natur. Mit einem Geleitwort von Niels Birbaumer. Schattauer Verlag 2011 ISBN 978-3-7945-2768-7
- Das Bild der Welt im Kopf. Eine Naturgeschichte des Geistes. LIT Verlag 2004 ISBN 3-8258-7181-9
- Vehikel. Experimente mit künstlichen Wesen, LIT Verlag Münster 2004 ISBN 3-8258-7160-6
- Vehicles: Experiments in synthetic psychology. MIT Press Cambridge 1984 ISBN 978-0-262-52112-3
- Ill oder Der Engel und die Philosophen. Roman. Haffmans Zürich 1999 ISBN 3-251-00424-7
- Information Processing in the Cortex. Experiments and Theory (mit Ad Aertsen), Springer-Verlag 1992 ISBN 3-540-55391-6
- Gescheit sein (und andere unwissenschaftliche Essays). Haffmans Zürich 1987 ISBN 3-251-00112-4
- Evolution: Entwicklung und Organisation in der Natur, das Bozner Treffen 1993 (with I. Hosp), Rowohlt, 1994, ISBN 3-499-19706-5
- Simulation: Computer zwischen Experiment und Theorie (editor with Inga Hosp), Rowohlt 1995 1490-ISBN 3499199270
- Gehirngespinste: Neuroanatomie für kybernetisch Interessierte Springer, Berlin, Germany, 1973, ISBN 3-540-06055-3
- On the Texture of Brains, An introduction to Neuroanatomy for the Cybernetically Minded Springer Verlag 1977, ISBN 978-0-387-08391-9
- Anatomy of the Cortex, Statistics and Geometry (with Almut Schüz), Springer Verlag 1991 ISBN 3-540-53233-1
- Atlas of the frog‘s brain (with M. Kemali), Springer, Berlin, Germany, (1969).
- Il Gusto Della Lingua Alfa & Beta, 1996, ISBN 88-7223-026-8

== Honours and namesakes ==
=== Awards named after Braitenberg ===
- Valentino Braitenberg Award for Computational Neuroscience—A biannual award by The Bernstein Association for Computational Neuroscience, supported by the Provinz Bozen.
- Golden Neuron Award, a prize initiated by Carla Braitenberg and Massimiliano Gulin.

== Literature ==
- Hosp, Inga; Schüz, Almut; Braitenberg, Zeno, eds. (2011). Tentakel des Geistes. Begegnungen mit Valentin Braitenberg. Arunda 81. Bolzano: Edition Raetia. ISBN 978-88-7283-403-9.

== See also ==
- Braitenberg Vehicles
- Connectionism
- Embodied cognitive science
