= Misha B. Ahrens =

HHMI scientist

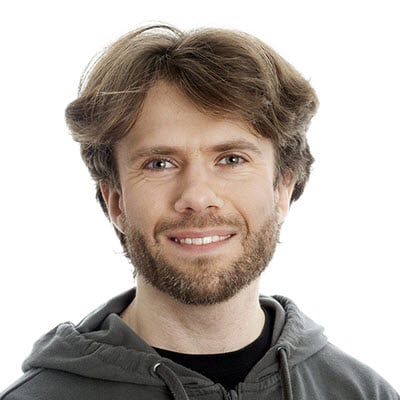

Misha Benjamin Ahrens is a Dutch-American neuroscientist working at the Janelia Research Campus of the Howard Hughes Medical Institute. He is best known for his work on whole-brain imaging of live larval zebrafish, and various analyses that result from this data.

== Early life and education ==
Ahrens was born in the Netherlands in 1981. His undergraduate studies were in mathematics and physics at Cambridge University. He then got a PhD in computational neuroscience at the University College London in the Gatsby Computational Neuroscience Unit, in the group of Maneesh Sahani and Jennifer Linden. Ahrens then became a Sir Henry Wellcome Postdoctoral Fellow in the lab of Florian Engert at Harvard University. In 2012 he moved to Janelia Research Campus of the Howard Hughes Medical Institute to start his own lab.

== Research and career ==
His lab works on understanding how behavior arises from information processing in distributed brain circuits, neuromodulatory systems, and glial cells of the zebrafish. In particular he specializes in whole brain imaging in live larval zebrafish, which is possible as the larvae are optically transparent. He is also one of the initiating groups at Janelia Research Campus that is leading the effort to make the first complete larval zebrafish connectome.

== Awards and honors ==
- In 2019, Ahrens won the Eric Kandel Young Neuroscientists Prize.
- Ahrens is a member of the Global Brain collaboration of the Simons Foundation.

== Selected publications ==
- Ahrens, Misha B; Li, Jennifer M; Orger, Michael B; Robson, Drew N; Schier, Alexander F; Engert, Florian; Portugues, Ruben (2012). "Brain-wide neuronal dynamics during motor adaptation in zebrafish" (PDF). Nature. 485 (7399). Nature Publishing Group UK London: 471–477. doi:10.1038/nature11057. PMC 3618960. PMID 22622571.
- Vladimirov, Nikita; Mu, Yu; Kawashima, Takashi; Bennett, Davis V; Yang, Chao-Tsung; Looger, Loren L; Keller, Philipp J; Freeman, Jeremy; Ahrens, Misha B (2014). "Light-sheet functional imaging in fictively behaving zebrafish" (PDF). Nature Methods. 11 (9). Nature Publishing Group US New York: 883–884. doi:10.1038/nmeth.3040. PMID 25068735.
- Dunn, Timothy W; Mu, Yu; Narayan, Sujatha; Randlett, Owen; Naumann, Eva A; Yang, Chao-Tsung; Schier, Alexander F; Freeman, Jeremy; Engert, Florian; Ahrens, Misha B (2016). "Brain-wide mapping of neural activity controlling zebrafish exploratory locomotion" (PDF). eLife. 5 e12741. eLife Sciences Publications, Ltd. doi:10.7554/eLife.12741. PMC 4841782. PMID 27003593.
- Mu, Yu; Bennett, Davis V.; Rubinov, Mikail; Narayan, Sujatha; Yang, Chao-Tsung; Tanimoto, Masashi; Mensh, Brett D.; Looger, Loren L.; Ahrens, Misha B. (2019). "Glia accumulate evidence that actions are futile and suppress unsuccessful behavior" (PDF). Cell. 178 (1). Elsevier: 27–43. doi:10.1016/j.cell.2019.05.050.
