= Gut–brain axis =

Biochemical signaling between the gastrointestinal tract and the central nervous system

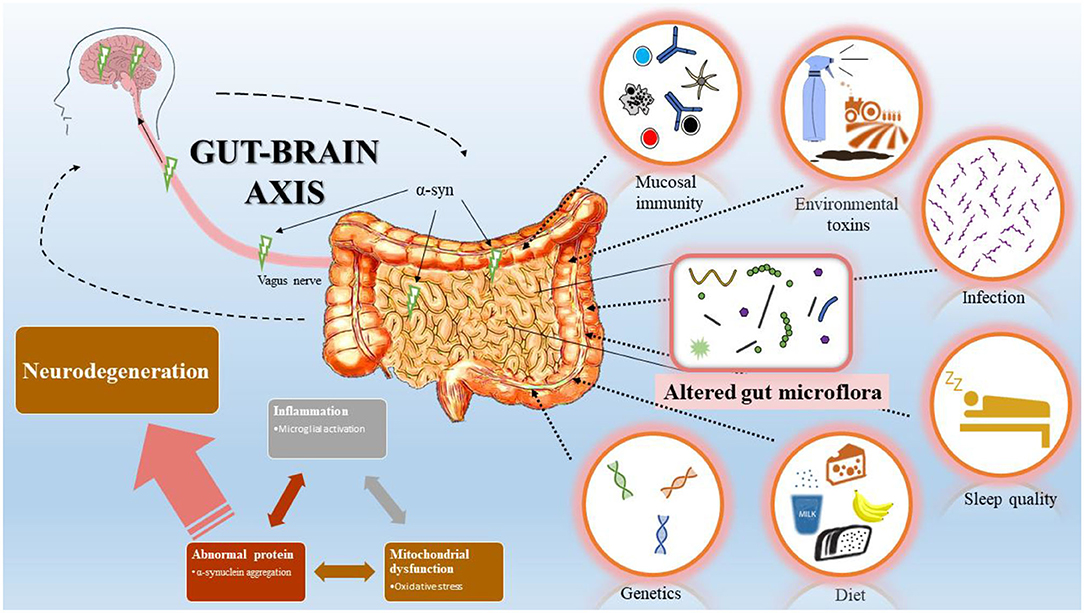
Gut–brain axis overview

The gut–brain axis, also described as gut–brain interaction, is the two-way biochemical signaling that takes place between the gastrointestinal tract (GI tract) and the central nervous system (CNS). The term "microbiota–gut–brain axis" highlights the putative role of gut microbiota interacting with brain functions, according to preliminary research. Broadly defined, the gut–brain axis includes the central nervous system, neuroendocrine system, neuroimmune systems, the hypothalamic–pituitary–adrenal axis (HPA axis), sympathetic and parasympathetic arms of the autonomic nervous system, the enteric nervous system, vagus nerve, and the gut microbiota. The history of ideas about a relationship between the gut and the mind dates from the nineteenth century.

Chemicals released by the gut microbiome can influence brain development, starting from birth. A review from 2015 states that the gut microbiome influences the CNS by "regulating brain chemistry and influencing neuro-endocrine systems associated with stress response, anxiety and memory function".

Various factors influence the human gut microbiota composition, accounting for the vast variability found amongst humans. Factors such as diet, medication exposure such as antibiotics, genetics, and environment all affect the framework of the human gut microbiota. These differences across populations may affect how the gut-brain axis is interpreted and studied. The diversity in the gut microbiomes across individuals has led to inconsistencies in this field of research.

The bidirectional communication may involve immune, endocrine, humoral and neural connections between the gastrointestinal tract and the central nervous system. A 2019 review of laboratory research suggests that the gut microbiome may influence brain function by releasing chemical signals, possibly including cytokines, neurotransmitters, neuropeptides, chemokines, endocrine messengers and microbial metabolites, such as "short-chain fatty acids, branched chain amino acids, and peptidoglycans". These chemical signals are then transported to the brain via the blood, neuropod cells, nerves, endocrine cells, where they may impact different metabolic processes.

The first of the brain–gut interactions shown, was the cephalic phase of digestion, in the release of gastric and pancreatic secretions in response to sensory signals, such as the smell and sight of food. This was first demonstrated by Pavlov through Nobel prize winning research in 1904.

As of October 2016, most of the work done on the role of gut microbiota in the gut–brain axis had been conducted in animals, or on characterizing the various neuroactive compounds that gut microbiota can produce.

== Enteric nervous system ==
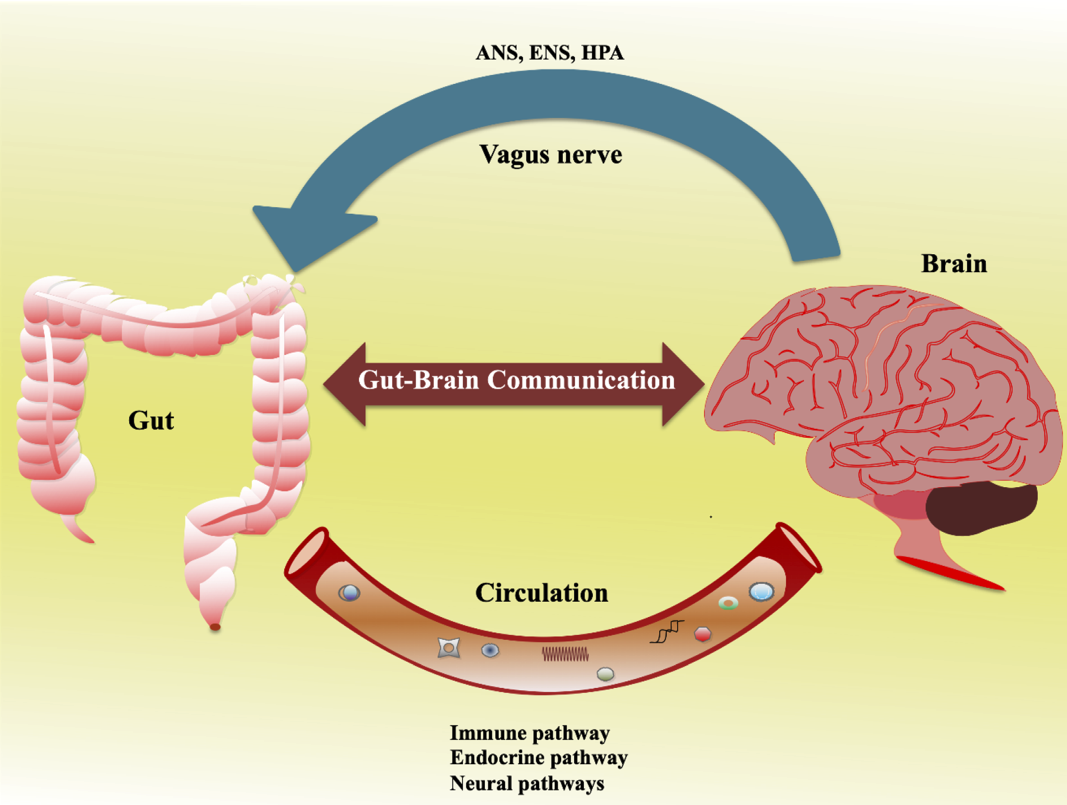
Gut-brain communication

The enteric nervous system is one of the main divisions of the nervous system and consists of a mesh-like system of neurons that governs the function of the gastrointestinal system; it has been described as a "second brain" for several reasons. The enteric nervous system can operate autonomously. It normally communicates with the central nervous system (CNS) through the parasympathetic (e.g., via the vagus nerve) and sympathetic (e.g., via the prevertebral ganglia) nervous systems. However, vertebrate studies show that when the vagus nerve is severed, the enteric nervous system continues to function.

In vertebrates, the enteric nervous system includes efferent neurons, afferent neurons, and interneurons, all of which make the enteric nervous system capable of carrying reflexes in the absence of CNS input. The sensory neurons report on mechanical and chemical conditions. Through intestinal muscles, the motor neurons control peristalsis and churning of intestinal contents. Other neurons control the secretion of enzymes. The enteric nervous system also makes use of more than 30 neurotransmitters, most of which are identical to the ones found in CNS, such as acetylcholine, dopamine, and serotonin. More than 90% of the body's serotonin lies in the gut, as well as about 50% of the body's dopamine; the dual function of these neurotransmitters is an active part of gut–brain research.

The first of the gut–brain interactions was shown to be between the sight and smell of food and the release of gastric secretions, known as the cephalic phase, or cephalic response of digestion.

== Gut microbiota ==
The gut microbiota is the complex community of microorganisms that live in the digestive tracts of humans and other animals. The gut metagenome is the aggregate of all the genomes of gut microbiota. The gut is one niche that human microbiota inhabit.

In humans, the gut microbiota has the largest quantity of bacteria and the greatest number of species, compared to other areas of the body. In humans, the gut flora is established at one to two years after birth; by that time, the intestinal epithelium and the intestinal mucosal barrier that it secretes have co-developed in a way that is tolerant to, and even supportive of, the gut flora and that also provides a barrier to pathogenic organisms.

The relationship between gut microbiota and humans is not merely commensal (a non-harmful coexistence), but rather a mutualistic relationship. Human gut microorganisms benefit the host by collecting the energy from the fermentation of undigested carbohydrates and the subsequent absorption of short-chain fatty acids (SCFAs), acetate, butyrate, and propionate. Intestinal bacteria also play a role in synthesizing vitamin B and vitamin K as well as metabolizing bile acids, sterols, and xenobiotics. The systemic importance of the SCFAs and other compounds they produce are like hormones and the gut flora itself appears to function like an endocrine organ; dysregulation of the gut flora has been correlated with a host of inflammatory and autoimmune conditions.

The composition of human gut microbiota changes over time, when the diet changes, and as overall health changes. In general, the average human has over 1000 species of bacteria in their gut microbiome, with Bacteroidetes and Firmicutes being the dominant phyla. Diets higher in processed foods and unnatural chemicals can negatively alter the ratios of these species, while diets high in whole foods can positively alter the ratios. Additional health factors that may skew the composition of the gut microbiota are antibiotics and probiotics. Antibiotics have severe impacts on gut microbiota, ridding of both good and bad bacteria. Without proper rehabilitation, it can be easy for harmful bacteria to become dominant. Probiotics may help to mitigate this by supplying healthy bacteria into the gut and replenishing the richness and diversity of the gut microbiota. There are many strains of probiotics that can be administered depending on the needs of a specific individual.

== Gut–brain integration ==
The gut–brain axis, a bidirectional neurohumoral communication system, is important for maintaining homeostasis and is regulated through the central and enteric nervous systems and the neural, endocrine, immune, and metabolic pathways, and especially including the hypothalamic–pituitary–adrenal axis (HPA axis). That term has been expanded to include the role of the gut microbiota as part of the "microbiome-gut-brain axis", a linkage of functions including the gut microbiota.

Interest in the field was sparked by a 2004 study (Nobuyuki Sudo and Yoichi Chida) showing that germ-free mice (genetically homogeneous laboratory mice, birthed and raised in an antiseptic environment) showed an exaggerated HPA axis response to stress, compared to non-GF laboratory mice.

The gut microbiota can produce a range of neuroactive molecules, such as acetylcholine, catecholamines, γ-aminobutyric acid, histamine, melatonin, and serotonin, which are essential for regulating peristalsis and sensation in the gut. Changes in the composition of the gut microbiota due to diet, drugs, or disease correlate with changes in levels of circulating cytokines, some of which can affect brain function. The gut microbiota also release molecules that can directly activate the vagus nerve, which transmits information about the state of the intestines to the brain.

Multiple pathways are implicated in the gut-brain axis. These pathways include neural signaling through the vagus nerve, endocrine signaling through stress hormones, and immune signaling mediated by cytokines. Gut barrier function and immune activity is influenced by metabolites such as short-chain fatty acids, which in turn affect the signaling received by the central nervous system. The pathways described are thought to work together simultaneously rather than function independently.

Likewise, chronic or acutely stressful situations activate the hypothalamic–pituitary–adrenal axis, causing changes in the gut microbiota and intestinal epithelium, and possibly having systemic effects. Additionally, the cholinergic anti-inflammatory pathway, signaling through the vagus nerve, affects the gut epithelium and microbiota. Hunger and satiety are integrated in the brain, and the presence or absence of food in the gut and types of food present also affect the composition and activity of gut microbiota.

Most of the work that has been done on the role of gut microbiota in the gut–brain axis has been conducted in animals, including the highly artificial germ-free mice. As of 2016, studies with humans measuring changes to gut microbiota in response to stress, or measuring effects of various probiotics, have generally been small and cannot be generalized; whether changes to gut microbiota are a result of disease, a cause of disease, or both in any number of possible feedback loops in the gut–brain axis, remains unclear.

Recent research has explored the gut-brain axis and its role in neurological or psychiatric conditions. Several studies have found associations between gut microbiota and psychiatric disorders such as depression, anxiety, and bipolar disorder; however, most of these come from animal studies and small human cohorts. Causal mechanisms are still being researched and at this point, the current literature considers these associations correlational and not causal.

The concept is of special interest in autoimmune diseases such as multiple sclerosis. This process is thought to be regulated via the gut microbiota, which ferment indigestible dietary fibre and resistant starch; the fermentation process produces short chain fatty acids (SCFAs) such as propionate, butyrate, and acetate.

SCFAs produced by microbes are critical for proper gut-brain axis modulation and brain health, as they help maintain blood-brain barrier integrity and suppress neuroinflammation. Because of these properties, SCFAs are being explored as therapeutics for Alzheimer’s disease, Parkinson’s disease, and other neurodegenerative conditions, as well as for stroke and other forms of brain injury. Their ability to cross the blood-brain barrier enables them to exert direct effects within the central nervous system. Supporting this, mice treated with live Clostridium butyricum, a butyrate-producing bacterium, show increased levels of butyric acid in the brain, and treatment was observed to support healing of cerebral ischemia-associated injury. While probiotic-based interventions such as this one are theoretically straightforward, they depend on whether administered bacteria can successfully integrate into the host gut microbiome, which remains a major challenge and limits the development of targeted probiotic therapeutics in humans. As a result, less targeted but potentially more replicable approaches, such as dietary modification, are also being explored. In particular, precision nutrition research is investigating how varying levels of prebiotics like dietary fiber can promote SCFA-producing microbes and thereby support brain health.

== Gallery ==
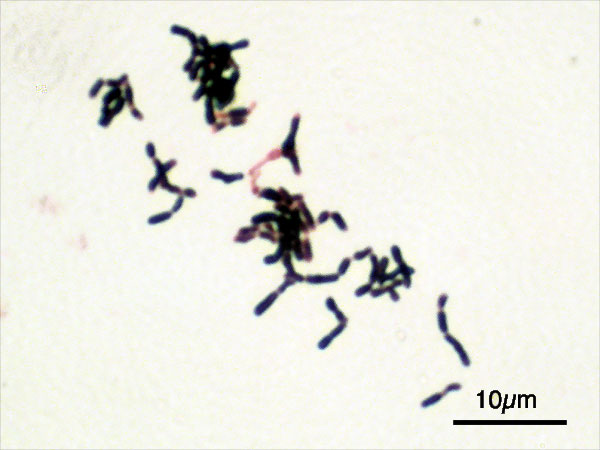
Bifidobacterium adolescentis

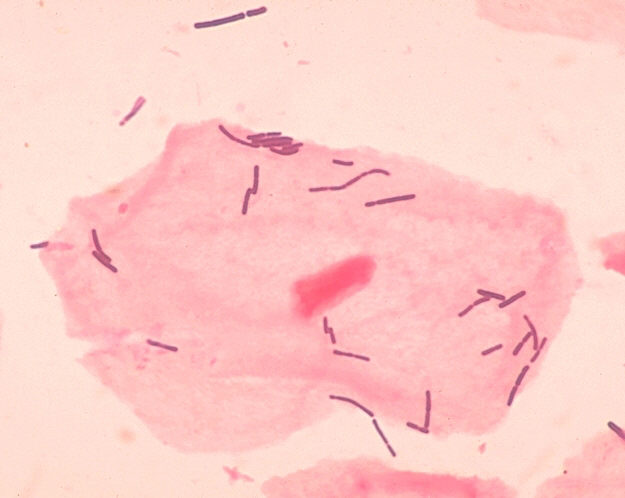
Lactobacillus sp 01
