= Ribo (robot) =

Humanoid robot

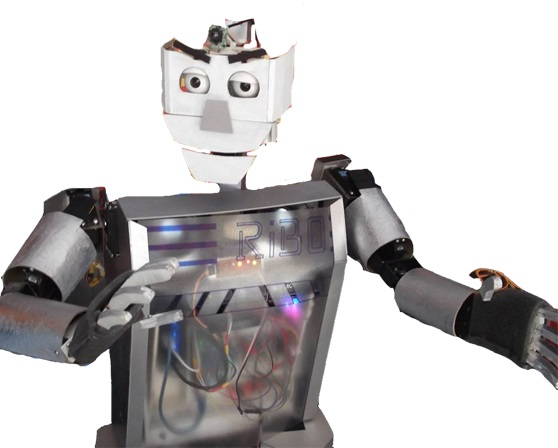
- Ribo
- Manufacturer: Shahjalal University of Science & Technology
- Country: Bangladesh
- Year of creation: 2015
- Type: Humanoid robot
- Website: fridaylabofficial.com

Ribo is the first social humanoid robot which can speak in Bengali. Ribo was created by RoboSUST, a robotics group of Shahjalal University of Science & Technology, Bangladesh. The team was supervised by Muhammed Zafar Iqbal. Bangladesh Science Fiction Society funded for making this humanoid robot Ribo. Ribo was first appeared in public on 11 December 2015 in a Science Fiction Festival held at the Public Library, Shahbag.

== Development history ==
The team of 11 members of RoboSUST has been working for many robotics projects since it started. The project SUSTU was the inauguration of forming a humanoid robot. It was able to write its name on a paper and follow the directions that had been shown. Bangladesh Science Fiction Society sponsored for a humanoid robot to represent it on the annual Science Fiction Festival. The team then started to work in full swing in November. With huge possibilities, they had been able to display in time the first social humanoid robot in Bangladesh which was named as Ribo. Ribo has 24 degrees of freedom. It is an upper torso robot. It includes the following features: dances, shows facial expressions, handshakes with people, hands up and down when asked to, makes eye contact to the person it's talking to, makes conversation in Bengali, responds to its name. Ribo can understand the facial gestures of people.

== Design ==
Ribo is an upper torso humanoid robot capable of interact with people. It features 24 degrees of freedom. It runs on a Core-2 Duo processor of 6GB RAM with another additional processor for hardware control. Ribo is controlled by Ubuntu and Windows based operating system (OS). The OS powers the robot's multimedia system including a camera, a microphone array with an RGB and depth camera. The microphone array of the Kinect device was used as the sound source for 3D sound localization. Ribo uses text-to-speech synthesis for robotic voice conversion. At right hand, Ribo uses a touch sensor to understand if someone grabbed its hand. Inside the eyeballs, there are cameras to make feel the depth of the eyes. The eyelids help Ribo to blink like a human being and the eyebrows help to show different facial expressions. By using a support vector machine, Ribo can understand facial gestures.

=== Specifications ===
Ribo
Height	129.54 centimetres (51.00 in)
Weight	12 kilograms (26 lb)
Power supply	AC, Li-Po 11.1V 25C
Degrees of Freedom	24 (Face: 8; Arm: 7×2; Torso: 2)
Processor	Intel Core 2 Duo, Arduino Mega
OS	Ubuntu, Windows
Programming language	Python, Java, C++, C#
Sensors	Motion sensors, RGB cameras, Microphone array, Touch sensor
Language	Bengali

== Public appearance ==
Ribo made its first public appearance at the Bangladesh Science Fiction Festival held in December 2015. In 2016, Ribo was demonstrated in the event of the ICT Expo which was held at Bangabandhu International Conference Center, Dhaka. At the year of 2016 & 2019, the robot was exhibited at the National Science Festival at Sylhet. In 2017, when Sophia (robot) visited Dhaka, it aroused vibe about Ribo. Because it took more than a million dollars to bring Sophia, where Ribo got only one lakh Taka fundings.

In 2018, Ribo was demonstrated in Natore at Chalanbil Utshob.

In 2019, Ribo was exhibited in National Physics Olympiad which was held at Sylhet.

== See also ==
- ASIMO
- Nao
- Humanoid robot
- Japanese robotics
- Actroid
- Android
- iCub
- HRP-4C
- REEM-B
- QRIO
- DARwIn-OP
- Musio
