= Salvius (robot) =

Open source humanoid robot

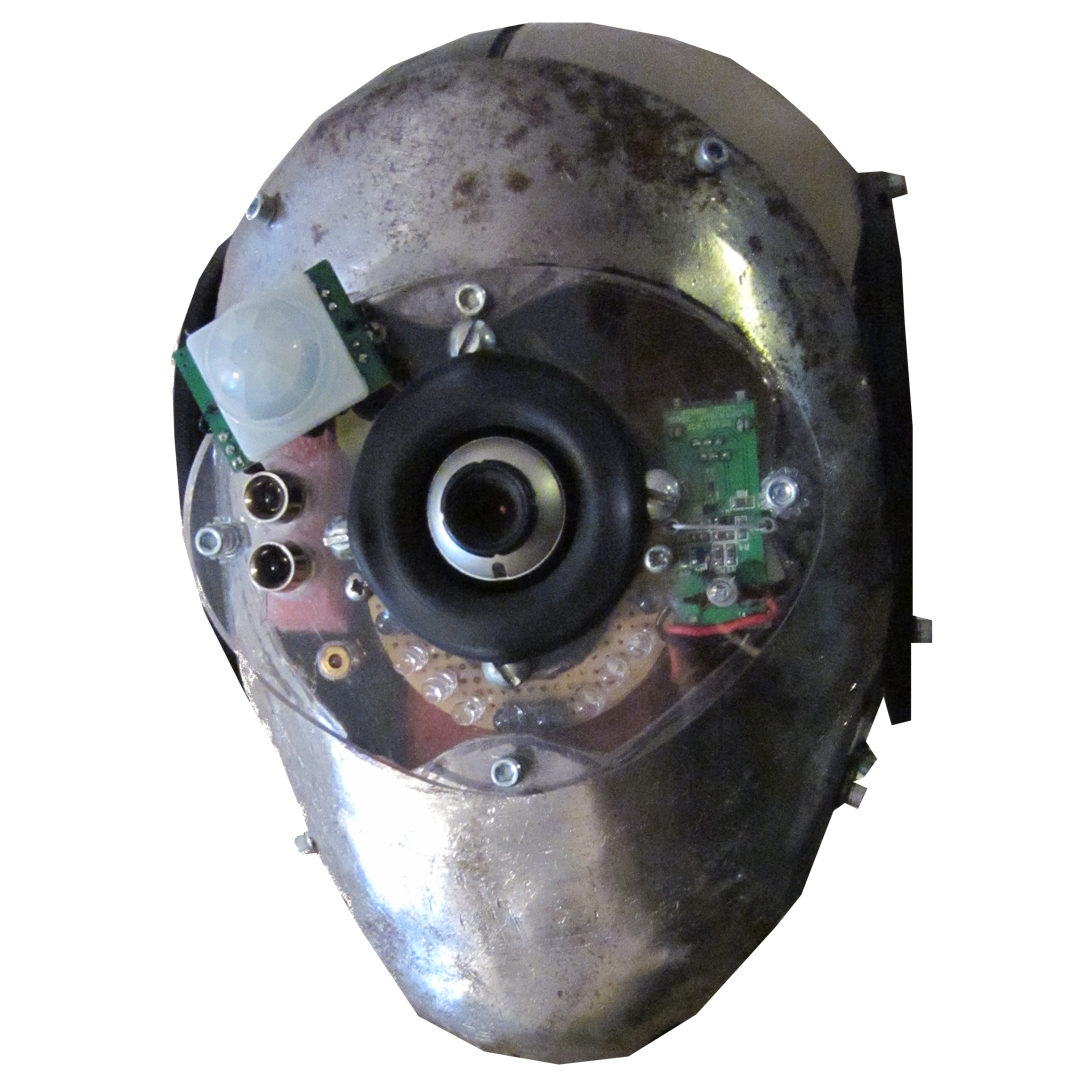
- Salvius (June 2012)
- Year of creation: 2008
- Type: Humanoid robot
- Purpose: Research and development
- Derived from: salvaged, Salvius
- Website: Salvius Robot Project

Salvius ( /ˈsælviəs/) is an open source humanoid robot built in the United States in 2008, the first of its kind. Its name is derived from the word 'salvaged', being constructed with an emphasis on using recycled components and materials to reduce the costs of designing and construction. The robot is designed to be able to perform a wide range of tasks due to its humanoid body structure planning. The primary goal for the Salvius project is to create a robot that can function dynamically in a domestic environment.

Salvius is a part of the open source movement, meaning the robot's source code is freely available for others to use, alter, add and learn. Unlike other humanoid robots, Salvius benefits from the advantages of open source software allowing problems to be quickly addressed by a community of developers. Salvius has been used as a resource by STEM educators to enable students to learn about subjects in science and technology.

The name "Salvius" dates back to the time of the Roman Empire, however, it was chosen for this robot because of its similarity to the word "salvage". Names have been a significant part of this robot's development. Salvius is tattooed with the names of the individuals and businesses that have contributed to the project's progress.

== Applications ==
Salvius is intended to be a resource for developers to experiment with machine learning and kinematic applications for humanoid robots. The robot is designed to allow new hardware features to be added or removed as needed using plug and play USB connections. Recent changes to the robots design have improved the robot's ability to connect to other devices so that developers can also investigate new ways that robots can interact with the Internet of Things (IoT).

== Development ==
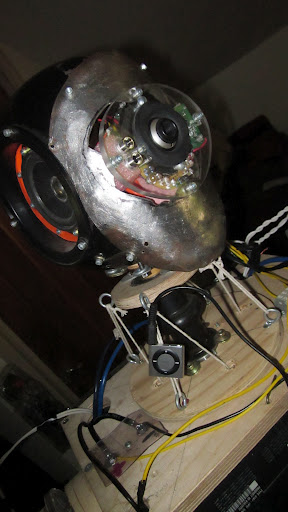
Salvius Robot Head Speaker

The robots construction has been documented since 2010. Its creation used recycling, and any commercially available parts used on the robot were chosen with availability and economic affordability in mind. Hardware items such as the Raspberry Pi and Arduino microcontrollers were selected for their open source design and their support communities. The robot uses multiple Arduino microcontrollers which were chosen based on the versatility and popularity of the platform across communities.

== Software ==
The robot's computer runs Raspbian Linux and primarily uses open source software. Salvius is able to operate autonomously as well as controlled remotely using an online interface. The robot's programming languages include: Python, Arduino, and JavaScript. Python is the supported language of the Raspberry Pi. C is used for programming the Arduino micro-controllers that the robot's main computer, a Raspberry Pi, communicates with. By sending tasks off to other boards it allows the robot to do parallel processing and distribute work load. The [star network] topography prevents a failure in the Arduino procession nodes from damaging the robot.

Salvius's API allows users to send and retrieve data. Its wireless connection allows control through a web interface to view what the robot sees. Since all the software is installed on the robot the user only needs a device with a working internet connection and a browser.

== Hardware ==
The robot is controlled by a network of Raspberry Pi and Arduino microcontrollers. The Raspberry Pi acts as a server for [high level programming languages] as its control function. The robot uses Grove motor controllers to control motors. Most of the robots motors have been salvaged from alternate sources and reused to construct the robot.

== Sensors ==
Sensors allow the robot to successfully interact with its environment. Sensors that have been used on the robot include: touch, sound, light, ultrasonic, and a PIR (Passive infrared sensor). The robot also has an Ethernet-connected IP camera which serves as its primary optical input device.

== Specifications ==
Height (ft)	6
Weight (lbs)	164
DOF	24
Battery (hrs)	1.2
Modality	Biped
Control	Autonomous, Teleoperated

== See also ==
- Humanoid robot
- Open-source robotics
- Actroid
- Android
- iCub
- HRP-4C
- REEM-B
- QRIO
- TOPIO
- Nao
