= Humanoid robot =

Human-like robots

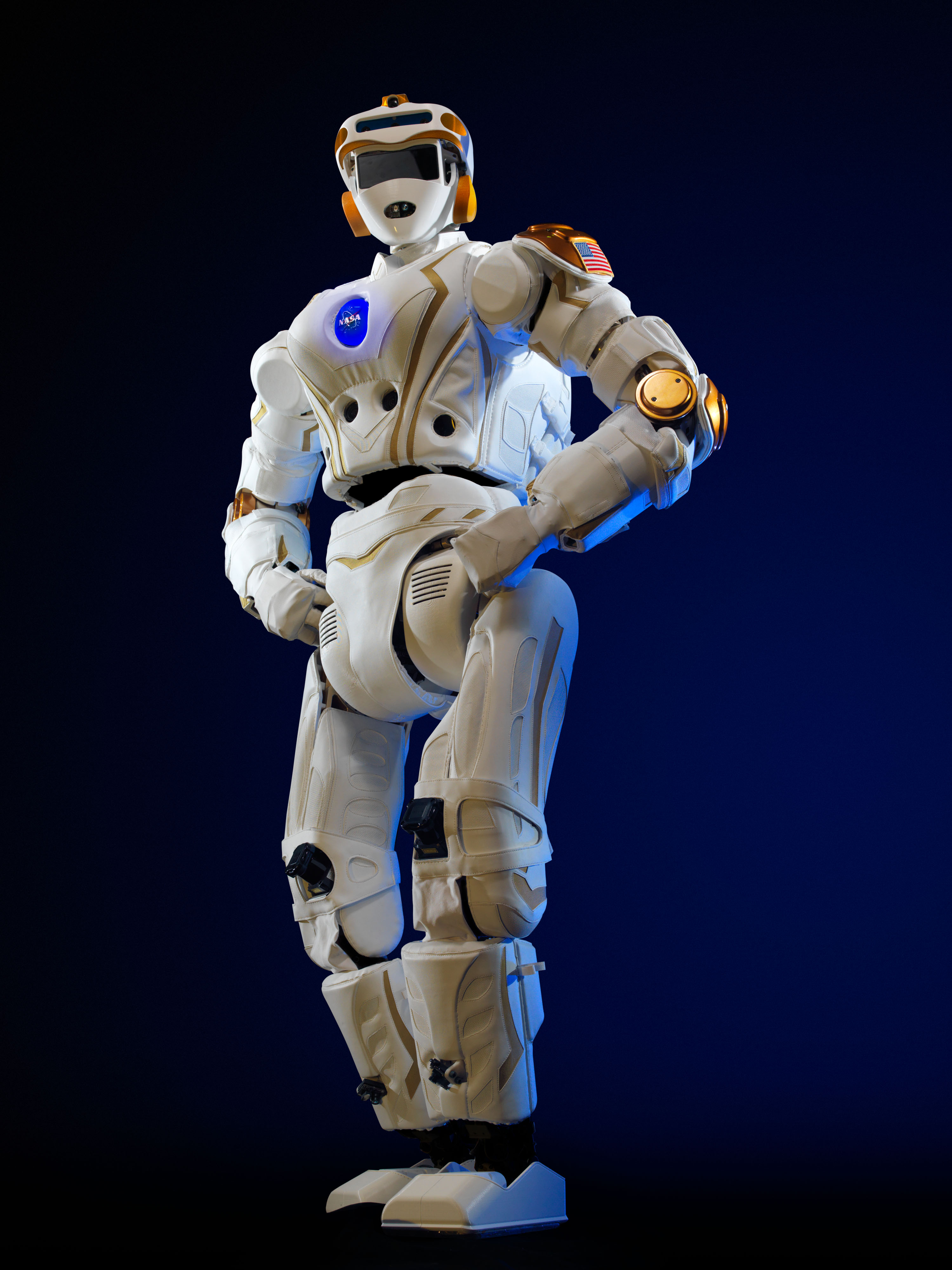
Valkyrie (R5), a humanoid robot from NASA

A humanoid robot is a robot resembling the human body in shape. The design may be aimed at functional purposes, such as interacting with human tools and environments and working alongside humans, for experimental purposes, such as the study of bipedal locomotion, or for other purposes.

In general, humanoid robots are characterized by their anthropomorphic design, which includes a torso, a head, two arms, and two legs. Some humanoid robots may have a more limited range of body replicas, comprising only a subset of the above-mentioned components.

The term android can refer to humanoid robots designed to closely resemble the human physique. The term gynoid is sometimes used to refer to robots with a feminine appearance.

== Applications ==
Figure AI robot package handling

=== Medical and research ===
Humanoid robots are a valuable resource in the world of medicine and biotechnology, as well as other fields of research such as biomechanics and cognitive science. Humanoid robots are being used to develop complex prosthetics for individuals with physical disabilities such as missing limbs. The WABIAN-2 is a new medical humanoid robot created to help patients in the rehabilitation of their lower limbs.

Although the initial aim of humanoid research was to build better orthosis and prosthesis for human beings, knowledge has been transferred between both disciplines. A few examples are powered leg prosthesis for the neuromuscularly impaired, ankle-foot orthosis, biological realistic leg prosthesis, and forearm prosthesis.

Humanoid robots can be used as test subjects for the practice and development of personalized healthcare aids, essentially performing as robotic nurses for demographics such as the elderly. Humanoids are also suitable for some procedurally-based vocations, such as reception-desk administrators and automotive manufacturing line workers. In essence, since they can use tools and operate equipment and vehicles designed for the human form, humanoids could theoretically perform any task a human being can, so long as they have the proper software. However, the complexity of doing so is immense.

While robot-assisted surgery previously relied on specialized hardware, remote-controlled surgeries using general-purpose humanoid robots were experimentally conducted in 2026, demonstrating new possibilities.

=== Entertainment ===
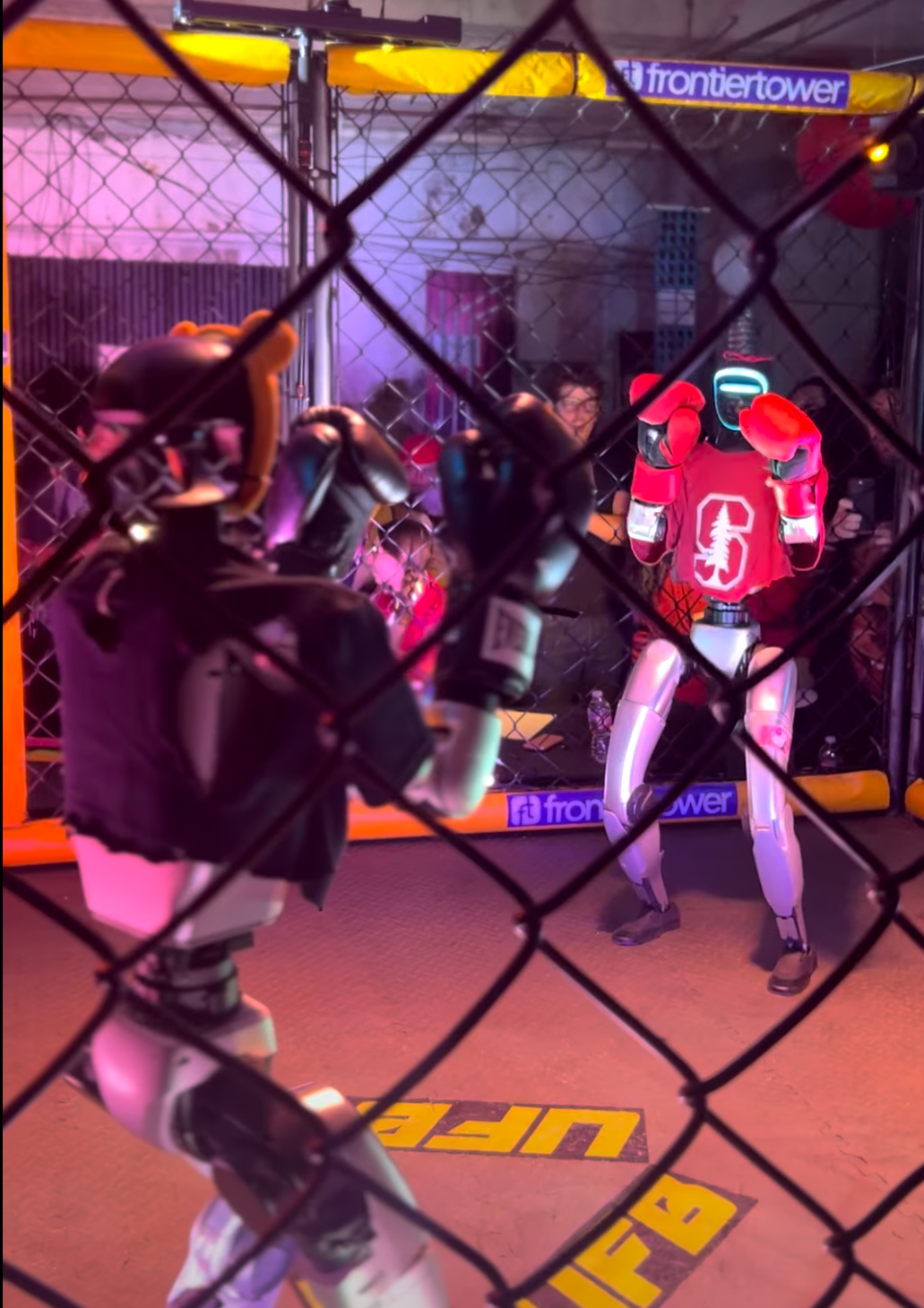
Humanoid robots in a staged boxing match during a robotics exhibition.

Humanoid robots have long appeared in entertainment and fiction, from mythological figures such as Prometheus to mechanical characters in early automata and science fiction films. In contemporary theme parks, humanoid machines are widely used as sophisticated animatronics that mimic human motion, facial expressions and speech. Research groups at Walt Disney Imagineering have developed "stuntronics", free-flying humanoid stunt doubles that use onboard sensing and control to perform aerial flips and poses during live shows, allowing characters such as superheroes to execute stunts that would be dangerous for human performers.

Outside of theme parks, humanoid robots increasingly appear in live sports-style events and competitions. In 2025 the Chinese robotics company Unitree live-streamed what it billed as the first boxing tournament between humanoid robots, with four G1 robots taking part in a small-ring event that combined remote control with short autonomous sequences. The same year, Beijing hosted the inaugural World Humanoid Robot Games, where more than 500 robots from 280 teams competed in events such as soccer, running and boxing and performed choreographed routines including hip-hop and martial arts during the opening ceremony. WHRG also advertises the capabilities of various manufacturers to investors and potential customers. Exhibition matches and tournaments with humanoid robot football teams have also been promoted as trials for future multi-sport robot events. Humanoid robots even performed as dancers during the opening ceremony of the 2026 Asian Beach Games in Sanya, China.

Humanoid robots have also been used as performers in concerts and televised shows. At the 2025 VOYAGEX music festival in Changchun, the PNDbotics humanoid Adam appeared on stage as a keytar player as part of a live band performance. Earlier that year, a Chinese Spring Festival television gala featured a choreographed routine in which sixteen Unitree H1 humanoid robots danced alongside human performers, presented as a demonstration of the country's progress in humanoid robotics. These and similar appearances at music events and public festivals have been described as ways to familiarise audiences with humanoid robots while showcasing advances in dynamic control, balance and human–robot interaction. Another example is the 2026 China Media Group Spring Festival Gala.

In July 2026, EngineAI debuted Ultimate Robot Knock-out Legend (URKL), a professional combat league for human-sized humanoid robots, with a cash prize pool of 1.4 million dollars and a ten kilogram pure gold belt to be given to the champion. The league issued EngineAI standardized T800 robots to all participating teams who competed by developing algorithms and strategies to help their robot beat their opponents. During the opening matches, a T800 landed a tornado kick that resulted in an opponent's head being decapitated. According to Zhao Tongyang, EngineAI's CEO, the competition was not solely for entertainment as data from the matches is used to further develop and improve the future generation of humanoids for commercial and industrial applications.

Various humanoid robots and their possible applications in daily life, including service and companion roles, are featured in the independent documentary film Plug & Pray, released in 2010.

=== Demonstrative ===
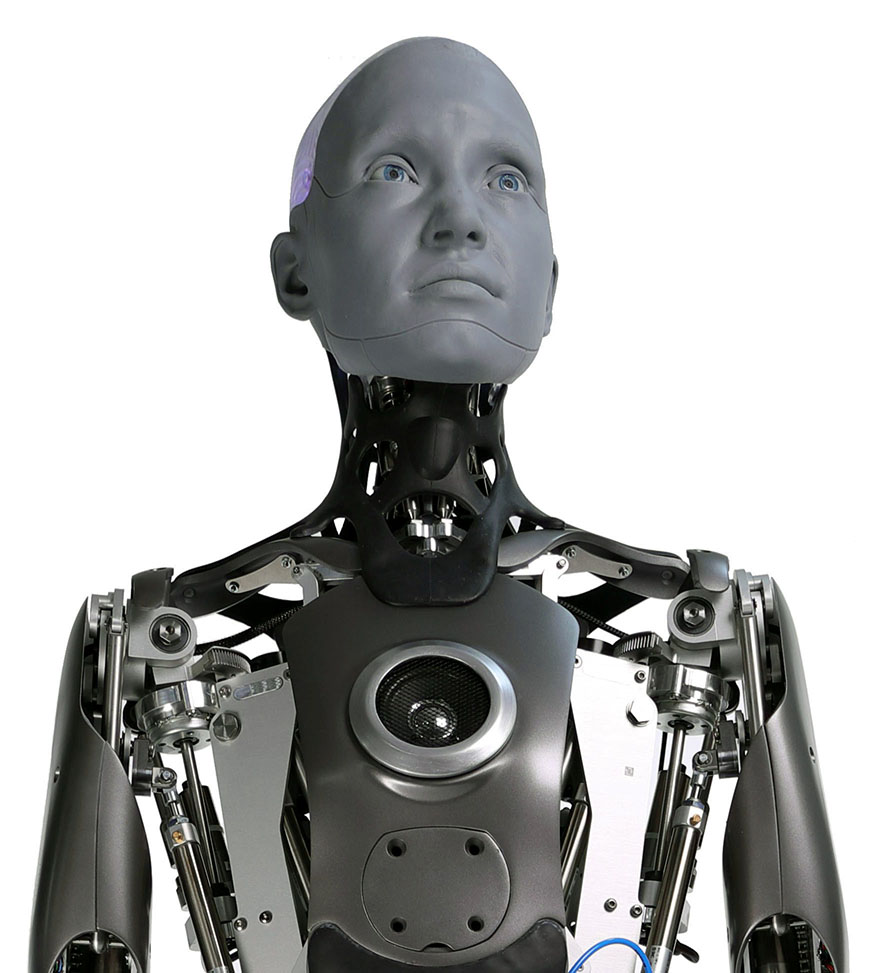
Ameca generation 1 pictured in the lab at Engineered Arts

Though many real-world applications for humanoid robots are unexplored, their primary use is to demonstrate up-and-coming technologies. Modern examples of humanoid robots, such as the Honda Asimo, are revealed to the public in order to demonstrate new technological advancements in motor skills, such as walking, climbing, and playing an instrument. Other humanoid robots have been developed for household purposes, however excel only in single purpose skills and are far from autonomous. Humanoid robots, especially those with artificial intelligence (AI) algorithms, could be useful for future dangerous and/or distant space exploration missions, without having the need to turn back around again and return to Earth once the mission is completed.

== Sensors ==
A sensor is a device that measures some attribute of the world. Being one of the three primitives of robotics (besides planning and control), sensing plays an important role in robotic paradigms.

Sensors can be classified according to the physical process with which they work or according to the type of measurement information that they give as output. In this case, the second approach was used.

=== Proprioceptive ===
Proprioceptive sensors sense the position, orientation, and speed of the humanoid's body and joints, along with other internal values.

In human beings, the otoliths and semi-circular canals (in the inner ear) are used to maintain balance and orientation. Additionally, humans use their own proprioceptive sensors (e.g. touch, muscle extension, limb position) to help with their orientation. Humanoid robots use accelerometers to measure the acceleration, from which velocity can be calculated by integration; tilt sensors to measure inclination; force sensors placed in robot's hands and feet to measure contact force with environment; position sensors that indicate the actual position of the robot (from which the velocity can be calculated by derivation); and even speed sensors.

=== Exteroceptive ===
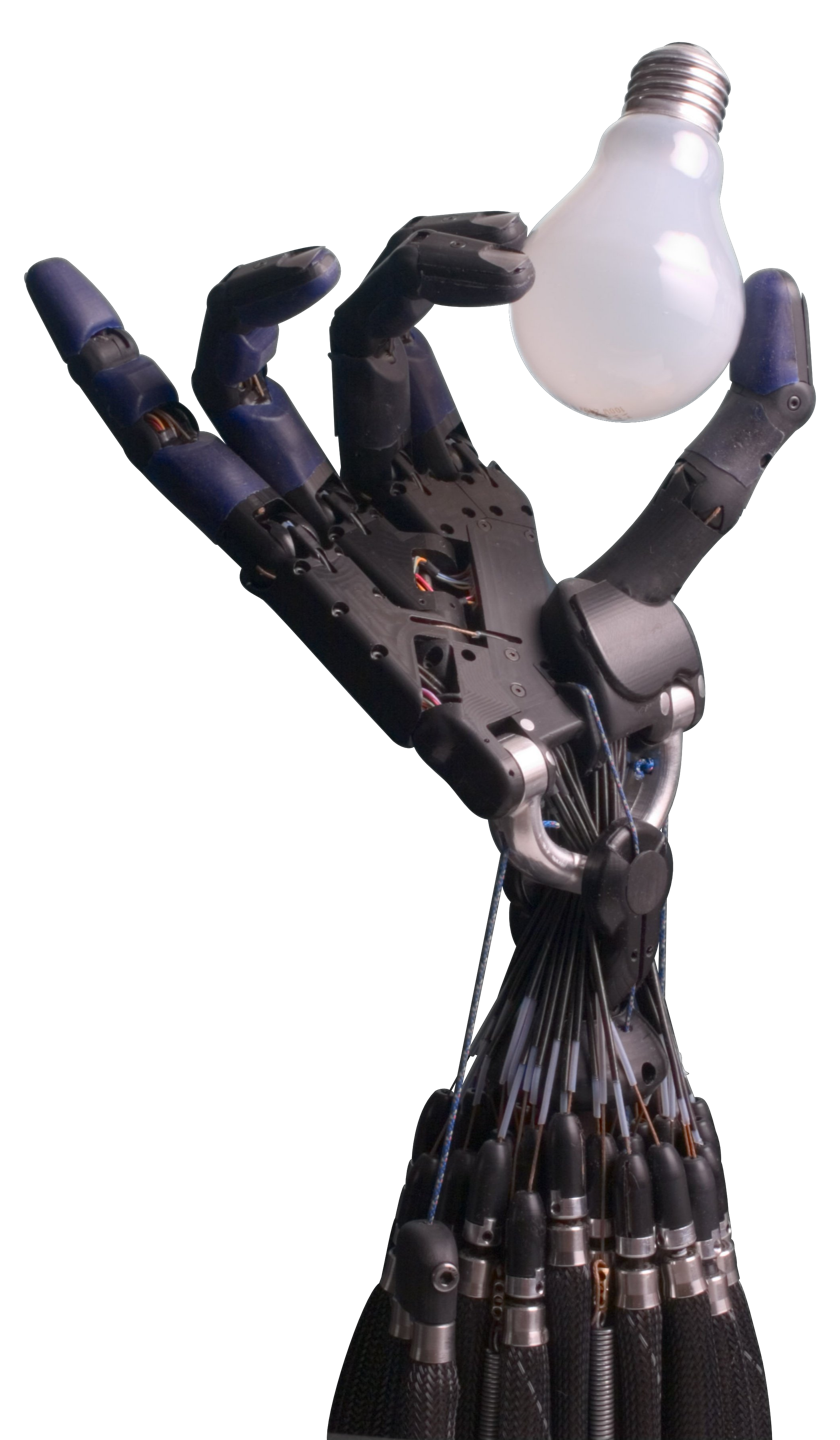
An artificial hand holding a lightbulb

Arrays of tactels can be used to provide data on what has been touched. The Shadow Hand uses an array of 34 tactels arranged beneath its polyurethane skin on each finger tip. Tactile sensors also provide information about forces and torques transferred between the robot and other objects.

Computer vision refers to the processing of data from any modality which uses light to produce an image. In humanoid robots it is used to recognize objects and determine their properties. Vision sensors work most similarly to the eyes of human beings. Most humanoid robots use charge-coupled device cameras as vision sensors.

Sound sensors allow humanoid robots to hear speech and environmental sounds, akin to the ears of the human being. Microphones are usually used for the robots to convey speech.

== Actuators ==
Actuators are the motors responsible for motion in the robot. The most popular example of a humanoid robot using hydraulic actuators was the original Atlas robot made by Boston Dynamics (retired in 2024).

Humanoid robots are constructed in such a way that they mimic the human body. They use actuators that perform like muscles and joints, though with a different structure. The actuators of humanoid robots can be either electric, pneumatic, or hydraulic. It is ideal for these actuators to have high power, low mass, and small dimensions.

=== Electric ===
Electric actuators are the most popular types of actuators in humanoid robots. These actuators are smaller in size, and a single electric actuator may not produce enough power for a human-sized joint. Therefore, it is common to use multiple electric actuators for a single joint in a humanoid robot. An example of a humanoid robot using electric actuators is HRP-2. By 2026, the industry transitioned toward integrated joint modules that combine high-torque brushless motors with strain wave gearing for increased power density.

=== Hydraulic ===
Hydraulic actuators produce higher power than electric actuators and pneumatic actuators, and they have the ability to control the torque they produce better than other types of actuators. However, they can become very bulky in size. One solution to counter the size issue is electro-hydrostatic actuators (EHA). The most popular example of a humanoid robot using hydraulic actuators is the ATLAS robot made by Boston Dynamics.

=== Pneumatic ===
Pneumatic actuators operate on the basis of gas compressibility. As they are inflated, they expand along the axis, and as they deflate, they contract. If one end is fixed, the other will move in a linear trajectory. A popular example of a pneumatic actuator is the Mac Kibben muscle.

== Planning and control ==
Planning in robots is the process of planning out motions and trajectories for the robot to carry out. Control is the actual execution of these planned motions and trajectories. In humanoid robots, the planning must carry out biped motions, meaning that robots should plan motions similar to a human. Since one of the main uses of humanoid robots is to interact with humans, it is important for the planning and control mechanisms of humanoid robots to work in a variety of terrain and environments.

The question of walking biped robots stabilization on the surface is of great importance. Maintenance of the robot's gravity center over the center of bearing area for providing a stable position can be chosen as a goal of control.

To maintain dynamic balance during the walk, a robot needs information about contact force and its current and desired motion. The solution to this problem relies on a major concept, the Zero Moment Point (ZMP).

Another characteristic of humanoid robots is that they move, gather information (using sensors) on the "real world", and interact with it. They do not stay still like factory manipulators and other robots that work in highly structured environments. To allow humanoids to move in complex environments, planning and control must focus on self-collision detection, path planning and obstacle avoidance.

Humanoid robots do not yet have some features of the human body. They include structures with variable flexibility, which provide safety (to the robot itself and to the people), and redundancy of movements, i.e. more degrees of freedom and therefore wide task availability. Although these characteristics are desirable to humanoid robots, they will bring more complexity and new problems to planning and control. The field of whole-body control deals with these issues and addresses the proper coordination of numerous degrees of freedom, e.g. to realize several control tasks simultaneously while following a given order of priority.

Some humanoid robots feature only the upper body, which is typically mounted to a wheeled base, drastically reducing the risk of falling common to bipedal units.

== Timeline of developments ==
Year	Subject	Notes
1898		Nikola Tesla publicly demonstrates his "automaton" technology by wirelessly controlling a model boat at the Electrical Exposition held at Madison Square Garden in New York City during the height of the Spanish–American War.
1921		Czech writer Karel Čapek introduced the word "robot" in his play R.U.R. (which stands for "Rossum's Universal Robots"). The word "robot" comes from the word "robota", meaning, in Czech and Polish, "labour, drudgery".
1927	Maschinenmensch	The Maschinenmensch ("machine-human"), a gynoid humanoid robot, also called "Parody", "Futura", "Robotrix", or the "Maria impersonator" (played by German actress Brigitte Helm), one of the earliest humanoid robots ever to appear on film, is depicted in Fritz Lang's film Metropolis.
1928	Eric	An electrical robot opens an exhibition of the Society of Model Engineers at London's Royal Horticultural Hall in London, and tours the world.
1939	Elektro	A humanoid robot built by the Westinghouse Electric Corporation
1941-42	Three Laws of Robotics	Isaac Asimov formulates the Three Laws of Robotics, used in his robot science fiction stories, and in the process of doing so, coins the word "robotics".
1948	Cybernetics	Norbert Wiener formulates the principles of cybernetics, the basis of practical robotics.
1961	Unimate	The first digitally operated and programmable non-humanoid robot, is installed on a General Motors assembly line to lift hot pieces of metal from a die casting machine and stack them. It was created by George Devol and constructed by Unimation, the first robot manufacturing company.
1967 to 1972	WABOT-1	Waseda University initiated the WABOT project in 1967, and in 1972 completed the WABOT-1, the world's first full-scale humanoid intelligent robot. It was the first android, able to walk, communicate with a person in Japanese (with an artificial mouth), measure distances and directions to the objects using external receptors (artificial ears and eyes), and grip and transport objects with hands.
1969		D.E. Whitney publishes his article "Resolved motion rate control of manipulators and human prosthesis".
1970	Zero Moment Point	Miomir Vukobratović proposed a theoretical model to explain bipedal locomotion.
1972	Powered exoskeleton	Vukobratović and his associates at Mihajlo Pupin Institute build the first active anthropomorphic exoskeleton.
1980		Marc Raibert established the MIT Leg Lab, which is dedicated to studying legged locomotion and building dynamic legged robots.
1983	Greenman	Using MB Associates arms, "Greenman" was developed by Space and Naval Warfare Systems Center, San Diego. It had an exoskeletal master controller with kinematic equivalency and spatial correspondence of the torso, arms, and head. Its vision system consisted of two 525-line video cameras each having a 35-degree field of view and video camera eyepiece monitors mounted in an aviator's helmet.
1984	WABOT-2	At Waseda University, the WABOT-2 is created, a musician humanoid robot able to communicate with a person, read a normal musical score with his eyes and play tunes of average difficulty on an electronic organ.
1985	WHL-11	Developed by Hitachi Ltd, WHL-11 is a biped robot capable of static walking on a flat surface at 13 seconds per step and it can also turn.
1986	Honda E series	Honda developed seven biped robots which were designated E0 (Experimental Model 0) through E6. E0 was in 1986, E1 – E3 were done between 1987 and 1991, and E4 - E6 were done between 1991 and 1993.
1989	Manny	A full-scale anthropomorphic robot with 42 degrees of freedom developed at Battelle's Pacific Northwest Laboratories in Richland, Washington, for the US Army's Dugway Proving Ground in Utah. It could not walk on its own but it could crawl, and had an artificial respiratory system to simulate breathing and sweating.
1990		Tad McGeer showed that a biped mechanical structure with knees could walk passively down a sloping surface.
1993	Honda P series	Honda developed P1 (Prototype Model 1) through P3, an evolution from E series, with upper limbs. Developed until 1997.
1995	Hadaly	Developed in Waseda University to study human-robot communication and has three subsystems: a head-eye subsystem, a voice control system for listening and speaking in Japanese, and a motion-control subsystem to use the arms to point toward campus destinations.
1995	Wabian	A human-size biped walking robot from Waseda University.
1996	Saika	A light-weight, human-size and low-cost humanoid robot, was developed at Tokyo University. Saika has a two-DOF neck, dual five-DOF upper arms, a torso and a head. Several types of hands and forearms are under development also. Developed until 1998.
1996	Vanderbilt Humanoid	The Intelligent Robotics Lab built ISAC (Intelligent Soft Arm Control) robot uses Bridgestone Robotics arms. The Bridgestone robotic arm uses pneumatic-actuated chambers to simulate the human-muscle contraction and expansion. In 1995, the two arms were augmented with a mechanical "head" called CATCH (Cost-effective Active Camera Head). CATCH was built by a graduate student, then used for autonomous navigation and put on the two arms to create the third humanoid in the World after Honda's Asimo and MIT's COG.
1997	Hadaly-2	A humanoid robot designed in Waseda University which realizes interactive communication with humans. It communicates not only informationally, but also physically.
2000	ASIMO	Honda creates its 11th bipedal humanoid robot, able to run.
2000	Xianxingzhe	The National University of Defense Technology creates the first bipedal humanoid robot in China.
2001	Qrio	Sony unveils small humanoid entertainment robots, dubbed Sony Dream Robot (SDR). Renamed Qrio in 2003.
2001	HOAP	Fujitsu realized its first commercial humanoid robot named HOAP-1. Its successors, HOAP-2 and HOAP-3, were announced in 2003 and 2005, respectively. HOAP is designed for a broad range of applications for R&D of robot technologies.
2002	HRP-2	A biped walking robot built by the Manufacturing Science and Technology Center (MSTC) in Tokyo.
2003	JOHNNIE	An autonomous biped walking robot built at the Technical University of Munich. The main objective was to realize an anthropomorphic walking machine with a human-like, dynamically stable gait.
2003	Actroid	A robot with realistic silicone "skin" developed by Osaka University in conjunction with Kokoro Company Ltd.
2004	Persia	Iran's first humanoid robot, was developed using realistic simulation by researchers of Isfahan University of Technology in conjunction with ISTT.
2004	KHR-1	A programmable bipedal humanoid robot introduced in June 2004 by a Japanese company Kondo Kagaku.
2005	HUBO	A walking humanoid robot developed by Korea Advanced Institute of Science and Technology in January 2005.
2005	PKD Android	A conversational humanoid robot made in the likeness of science fiction novelist Philip K Dick, was developed as a collaboration between Hanson Robotics, the FedEx Institute of Technology, and the University of Memphis.
2005	Wakamaru	A Japanese domestic robot made by Mitsubishi Heavy Industries, primarily intended to provide companionship to elderly and disabled people.
2005	Actroid	The Geminoid series is a series of ultra-realistic humanoid robots developed by Hiroshi Ishiguro of ATR and Kokoro in Tokyo. The original one, Geminoid HI-1, was made at its image. Followed Geminoid-F in 2010 and Geminoid-DK in 2011.
2006	Nao	A small open source programmable humanoid robot developed by Aldebaran Robotics, in France. Widely used by worldwide universities as a research platform and educational tool.
2006	REEM-A	The first fully autonomous European biped humanoid robot, designed to play chess with the Hydra Chess engine. The first robot developed by PAL Robotics, it was also used as a walking, manipulation, speech and vision development platform.
2006	iCub	A biped humanoid open source robot for cognition research.
2006	Mahru	A network-based biped humanoid robot developed in South Korea.
2007	TOPIO	A ping pong playing robot developed by TOSY Robotics JSC.
2007	Twendy-One	A robot developed by the WASEDA University Sugano Laboratory for home assistance services. It is not biped, as it uses an omni-directional mobile mechanism.
2008	Justin	A humanoid robot developed by the German Aerospace Center (DLR).
2008	Nexi	The first mobile, dexterous, and social robot, makes its public debut as one of TIME magazine's top inventions of the year. The robot was built through a collaboration between the MIT Media Lab Personal Robots Group, UMass Amherst and Meka Robotics.
2008	Salvius	The first open source humanoid robot built in the United States is created.
2008	REEM-B	The second biped humanoid robot developed by PAL Robotics. It has the ability to autonomously learn its environment using various sensors and carry 20% of its own weight.
2008	Surena	It had a height of 165 centimetres and weight of 60 kilograms, and is able to speak according to predefined text. It also has remote control and tracking ability.
2009	HRP-4C	A Japanese domestic robot made by National Institute of Advanced Industrial Science and Technology, shows human characteristics in addition to bipedal walking.
2009	Kobian	A robot developed by Waseda University can walk, talk, and mimic emotions.
2009	DARwIn-OP	An open source robot developed by ROBOTIS in collaboration with Virginia Tech, Purdue University, and University of Pennsylvania. This project was supported and sponsored by NSF.
2010	Robonaut 2	A very advanced humanoid robot by NASA and General Motors. It was part of the payload of Shuttle Discovery on the successful launch February 24, 2011. It is intended to do spacewalks for NASA.
2010	HRP-4C	National Institute of Advanced Industrial Science and Technology demonstrate their humanoid robot singing and dancing along with human dancers.
2010	REEM	A humanoid service robot with a wheeled mobile base. Developed by PAL Robotics, it can perform autonomous navigation in various surroundings and has voice and face recognition capabilities.
2011	ASIMO	In November, Honda unveiled its second generation Honda Asimo Robot. The all new Asimo is the first version of the robot with semi-autonomous capabilities.
2012	NimbRo	The Autonomous Intelligent Systems Group of University of Bonn, Germany, introduces the Humanoid TeenSize Open Platform NimbRo-OP.
2013	TORO	The German Aerospace Center (DLR) presents the humanoid robot TORO (TOrque-controlled humanoid RObot).
2013	TORO	On December 20–21, 2013, DARPA Robotics Challenge ranked the top 16 humanoid robots competing for the US$2 million cash prize. The leading team, SCHAFT, with 27 out of a possible score of 30 was bought by Google.
2013	REEM-C	PAL Robotics launches REEM-C, the first humanoid biped robot developed as a robotics research platform 100% ROS based.
2013	Poppy	The first open-source 3D-printed humanoid robot. Bio-inspired, with legs designed for biped locomotion. Developed by the Flower Departments at INRIA.
2013	Valkyrie (R5)	Developed by NASA. The primary objective was to create a robot capable of supporting future NASA missions, whether by performing tasks in advance of human arrival on other planets or by serving as an assistant to human teams during missions.
2014	Manav	India's first 3D printed humanoid robot developed in the laboratory of A-SET Training and Research Institutes by Diwakar Vaish (head Robotics and Research, A-SET Training and Research Institutes).
2014	Pepper robot	After the acquisition of Aldebaran, SoftBank Robotics releases a robot available for the public.
2014	Nadine	A female humanoid social robot designed in Nanyang Technological University, Singapore, and modelled on its director Professor Nadia Magnenat Thalmann. Nadine is a socially intelligent robot which returns greetings, makes eye contact, and remembers all the conversations it has had.
2016	Sophia	A humanoid robot developed by "Hanson Robotics", Hong Kong, and modelled after Audrey Hepburn. Sophia has artificial intelligence, visual data processing and facial recognition.
2016	OceanOne	Developed by a team at Stanford University, led by computer science professor Oussama Khatib, OceanOne completed its first mission, diving for treasure in a shipwreck off the coast of France, at a depth of 100 meters. The robot is controlled remotely, has haptic sensors in its hands, and artificial intelligence capabilities.
2016	Ayuda	Service robot developed by Taiwan-based company Syscom Computer Engineering Co., Ltd.(凌群電腦) designed for customer service, information assistance, and smart facility applications.
2017	TALOS	PAL Robotics launches TALOS, a fully electrical humanoid robot with joint torque sensors and EtherCAT communication technology that can manipulate up to 6 kg payload in each of its grippers.
2018	Rashmi Robot	A multilingual realistic humanoid robot was launched in India by Ranjit Shrivastav having emotional interpretation capabilities
2020	Digit	On January 5, 2020 Agility Robotics introduced the first version of Digit, their humanoid robot, initially purchased by Ford Motor Company for research into autonomous last-mile delivery.
2020	Vyommitra	A female-looking spacefaring humanoid robot being developed by the Indian Space Research Organisation to function on board the Gaganyaan, a crewed orbital spacecraft.
2020	Robot Shalu	Homemade Artificially Intelligent, Indian Multilingual Humanoid Robot, made-up of waste materials, that can speak 9 Indian and 38 foreign languages (total 47 languages), developed by Dinesh Kunwar Patel, Computer Science teacher, Kendriya Vidyalaya Mumbai, India. Shalu can recognize a person and remember them, identify many objects, solve mathematical problems, give horoscopes and weather reports, teach in a classroom, conduct a quiz, and do many other things.
2022	Ameca	In January 2022 Engineered Arts Ltd gave the first public demonstration of their humanoid robot Ameca.
2022	Optimus	On October 1, 2022, Tesla unveiled version 1 of their humanoid robot Optimus.
2023	Digit	On March 20, 2023 Agility Robotics revealed the fourth version of Digit. Adding a head, new manipulators, and perception systems.
2023	Optimus	In December 2023, Tesla unveiled Optimus version 2, featuring 30% faster movement, 10 kg less weight, and sensors on all 10 fingers.
2024	Atlas, Electric	In April 2024, after the retirement of the hydraulic version of Atlas, Boston Dynamics released an all electric version of Atlas with a broader range of motion and higher dexterity than the former model.
2024	G1	In May 2024, Unitree Robotics released new humanoid robot with upgraded mobility, most noted for its affordable price point starting at $16k. The design is comparable to Boston Dynamic's upgraded Atlas.
2024	HumanPlus	In June 2024, Stanford researchers announced a prototype robot that could mimic human movement to learn how to perform actions such as playing table tennis and the piano.
2024	Digit	In June 2024, Agility Robotics announced that 5 of its Digit robots had begun handling tasks in the factory of its customer GXO Logistics.
2025	SE01	In February 2025, Engine AI demonstrated a humanoid robot that could perform a forward flip.
	Factory deployments	In 2025, humanoid robots entered mass industrial deployment for the first time. Figure AI's Figure 02 supported production of over 30,000 vehicles at BMW's Spartanburg plant, while Unitree Robotics shipped more than 5,500 units globally. Goldman Sachs projected the humanoid robot market would reach $38 billion by 2035.
	TM Xplore I	In August 2025, Techman unveiled TM Xplore I, the first bipedal humanoid industrial robot designed and manufactured in Taiwan.
	NEO	In October 2025, 1X Technologies unveils NEO, the first consumer-ready bipedal humanoid robot designed for home use.
	AIdol	In November 2025, AIdol presented its humanoid robot during an event in Moscow. The presentation failed when the robot fell over after it had taken a few steps. It had to be removed by staff members.
	AgiBot	In November 2025, AgiBot's A2 model walked 100 km from Suzhou to Shanghai in 3 days, entering the Guinness World Records for doing so.
2026	Lightning	Bipedal robots built by Honor took the first three places in the Beijing E-Town Half-Marathon, with the winning robot, Lightning, breaking the human world record by about 7 minutes.
2026	Agile ONE	In April 2026, Agile Robots SE presented its first humanoid robot for industrial applications at Hannover Messe. The company had announced the launch of the robot in November 2025.
2026	Gatsby	In May 2026, San Francisco startup Gatsby performs the first humanoid robot cleaning for a paying consumer in the United States.

== In science fiction ==
A common theme for the depiction of humanoid robots in science fiction pertains to how they can help humans in society or serve as threats to humanity. This theme essentially questions whether artificial intelligence is a force of good or bad for mankind. Humanoid robots that are depicted as good for society and benefit humans include Commander Data in Star Trek and C-3PO in Star Wars. Opposite portrayals where humanoid robots are shown as terrifying and threatening to humans include the T-800 in Terminator and Megatron in Transformers. An Indian Tamil-language film, Enthiran, showed the benefits and disadvantages of a humanoid robot, Chitti.

Another prominent theme found in science fiction regarding humanoid robots focuses on personhood. Certain films, particularly Blade Runner and Blade Runner 2049, explore whether or not a constructed, synthetic being should be considered a person. In the films, androids called "replicants" are created indistinguishably from human beings, yet they are shunned and do not possess the same rights as humans. This theme incites audience sympathy while also sparking unease at the idea of humanoid robots mimicking humans too closely.

The term gynoid was first used by Isaac Asimov in a 1979 editorial, as a theoretical female equivalent of the word android.

== Criticism ==
Humanoid robots are considered inefficient for performing many kinds of work as they share the same general flaws present in the human form and can be outperformed by other kinds of robots. Some have suggested that forcing robots to perform labor could be akin to slavery, but others argue that there is no reason to think AI is conscious. Sex robots may present ethical issues and robots designed to look like humans can evoke feelings of unease or revulsion in humans due to the uncanny valley effect.

== See also ==
- Biological robot
- Electronic persons
- Frankenstein complex
- List of fictional robots and androids
- List of roboticists
- List of robots
- Non-carbon lifeforms
- Personal robot
- World Humanoid Robotics Games
