= Mahru =

Mahru may refer to:

- Mahru Rural District, an administrative subdivision of Iran
- MAHRU, a model robot
