= Electronic persons =

Electronic persons is a term first proposed by the European Parliament's Committee on Legal Affairs in a draft report on civil law rules on robotics dated May 31, 2016. The term is used to describe the potential legal status of the most sophisticated autonomous robots so that they may have "specific rights and obligations, including that of making good any damage they may cause, and applying electronic personality to cases where robots make smart autonomous decisions or otherwise interact with third parties independently".

== See also ==
- Walkovszky v. Carlton, 223 N.E.2d 6 (NY 1966) a US corporate law case, showing how legal personality of taxi corporations was used for to evade responsibility to people for personal injury
- Humanoid robot
- Ethics of artificial intelligence
- Mady Delvaux-Stehres
