= Peggy Johnson =

American businesswoman

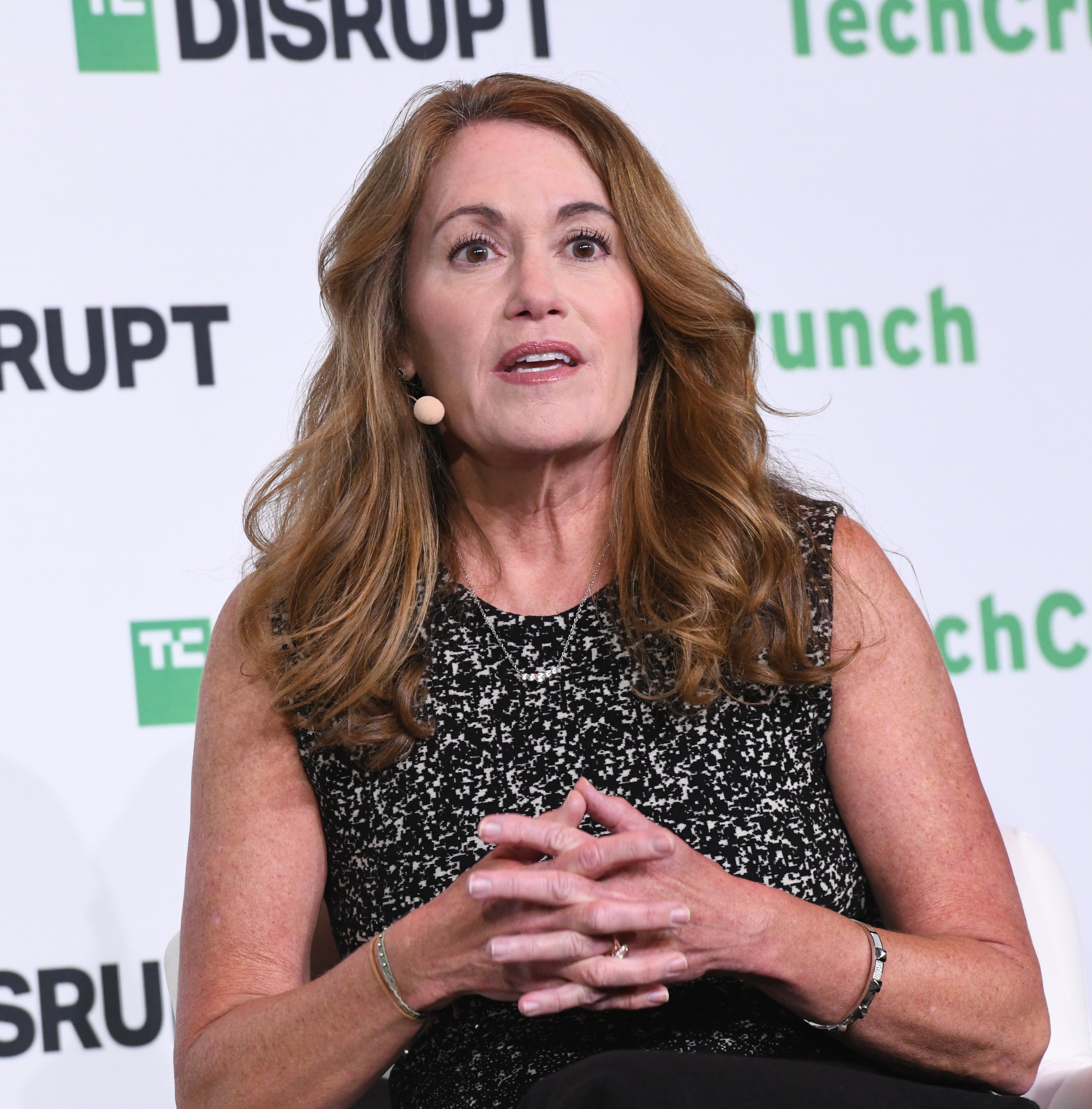
- Johnson in 2023
- Born: 1960 or 1961 (age 64–65)
- Education: San Diego State University (BSEE)
- Board member of: BlackRock
- Children: 3

Peggy Johnson (born 1960 or 1961) is an American businesswoman who is the chief executive officer of Agility Robotics appointed in March 2024. Previous to this role she was the CEO of Magic Leap, succeeding Rony Abovitz in September 2020. Before joining Magic Leap, she held the position of executive vice president of business development at Microsoft.

== Early life and education ==
Johnson was raised in Alhambra, California. She has a BS degree in Electrical Engineering from San Diego State University.

== Career ==
After college, Johnson joined General Electric as Engineer in their Military Electronics division.

Johnson later joined Qualcomm, starting out as Engineer who often traveled with business teams to translate technical details of a solution for customers. She eventually transitioned from her technical role to a business role within Qualcomm.

At Qualcomm, she worked on cutting-edge technologies including mobile connectivity and app stores.

After 24 years at Qualcomm, she joined Microsoft as executive vice-president of business development. Microsoft paid Johnson a US$7.8 million signing bonus. In this role, she drove business deals and partnerships for the company.

Johnson joined the board of BlackRock in 2018.

In August 2020, Johnson joined Magic Leap as chief executive officer. After completing Magic Leap's enterprise pivot, she left in October 2023.

In March 2024, Johnson became the Chief Executive Officer of Agility Robotics.

== Awards and recognition ==
In 2016, Business Insider recognized Johnson as #2 among the most powerful women engineers in the world and Silicon Republic recognized her as #14 among the most powerful women leading tech around the world.

In 2017, Business Insider recognized her as the most powerful female engineer in the United States.

Johnson was inducted into the Women in Technology International Hall of Fame in 2013 and named one of the top 100 women leaders in STEM in 2012 by STEMconnector.

== Personal life ==
Peggy Johnson is married and has three children.
