= TOPIO =

Bipedal humanoid robot

TOPIO ("TOSY PIng Pong Playing RobOt") is a bipedal humanoid robot designed to play table tennis against a human being. It has been developed since 2005 by TOSY, a robotics firm in Vietnam. It was publicly demonstrated at the Tokyo International Robot Exhibition (IREX) on November 28, 2007. TOPIO 3.0 (the latest version of TOPIO) stands approximately 1.88 m (6 ft 2 in) tall and weighs 120 kg (260 lb).

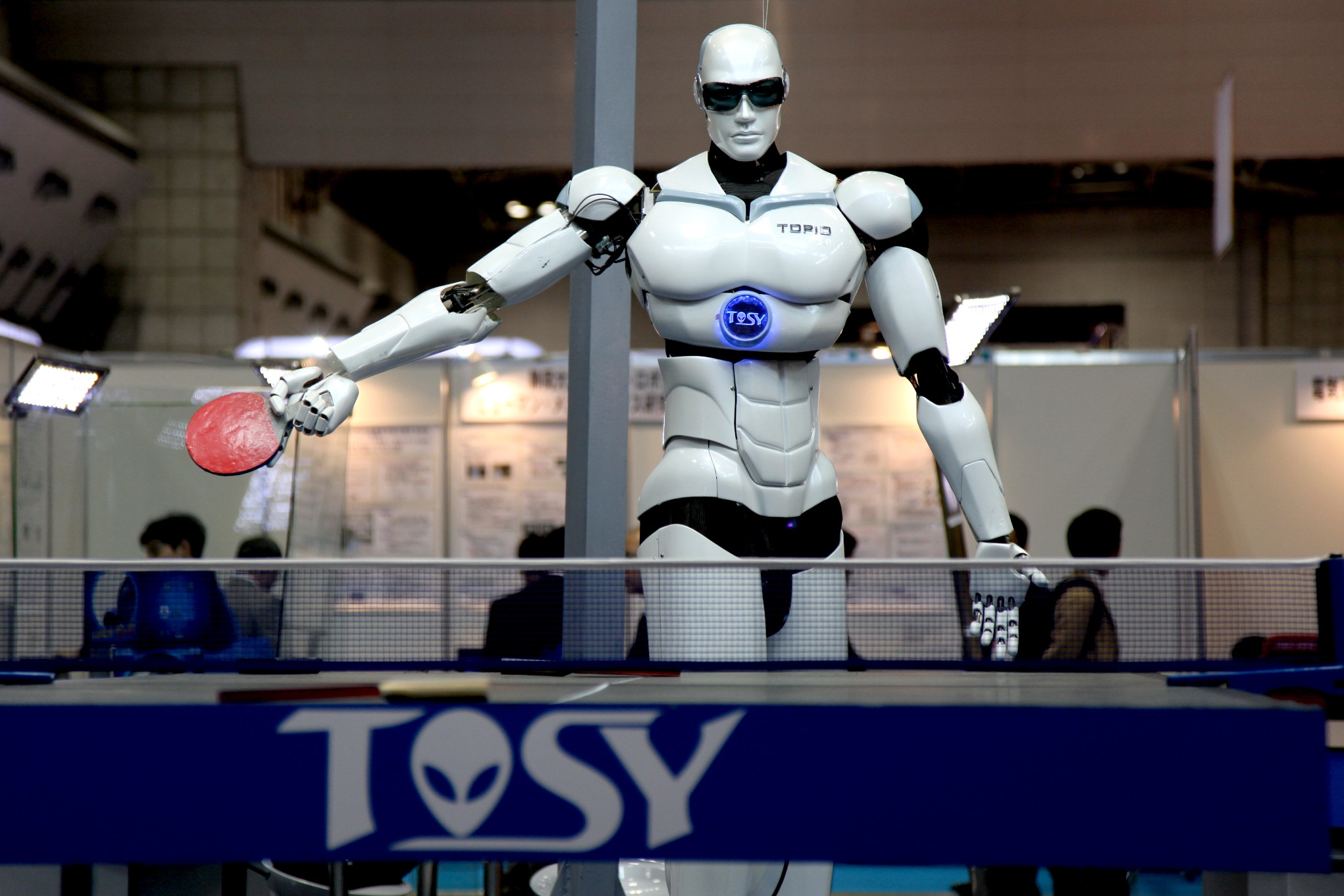
TOPIO 3.0 at IREX 2009

== Development history ==
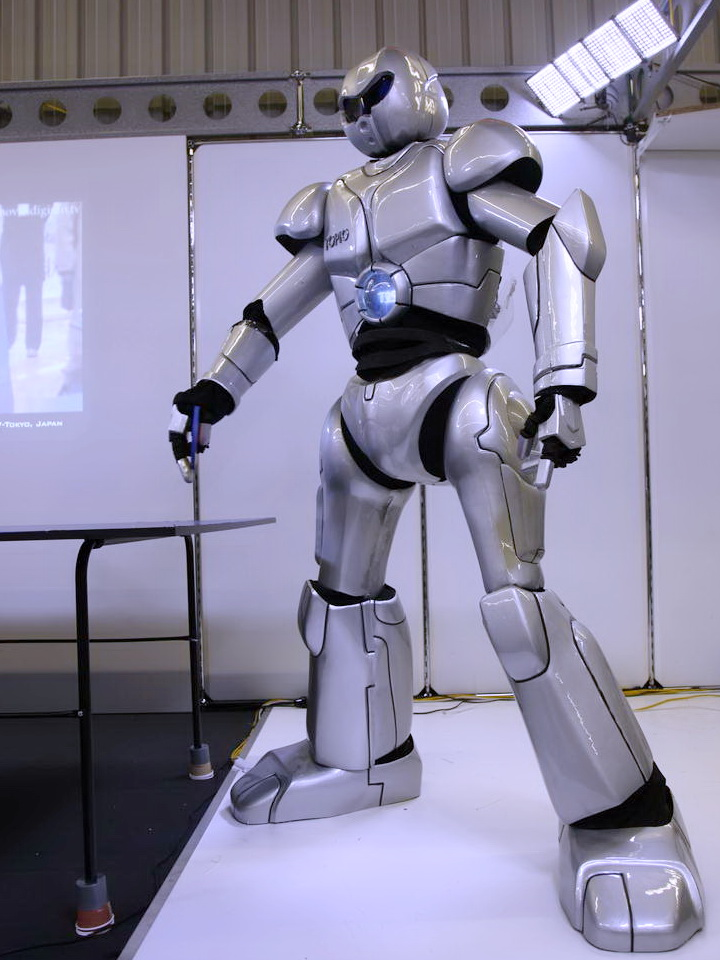
TOPIO 2.0 at Nuremberg International Toy Fair 2009

Time	Place	Event	Notes
November, 2005	TOSY Robotics	Project TOPIO was started	
July, 2007	TOSY Robotics	First experiment version of TOPIO demonstrated	8 degrees of freedom, 1 leg, hydraulic system
28 November 2007	Tokyo International Robot Exhibition, Japan	TOPIO 1.0 publicly demonstrated	20 degrees of freedom, 6 legs, hydraulic system
5 February 2009	Nuremberg International Toy Fair, Germany	TOPIO 2.0 publicly demonstrated	42 degrees of freedom, 2 legs, DC servo motors
25 November 2009	Tokyo International Robot Exhibition, Japan	TOPIO 3.0 publicly demonstrated	39 degrees of freedom, 2 legs, Brushless DC servo motors
4–9 February 2010	Nuremberg International Toy Fair, Germany	TOPIO 3.0 publicly demonstrated	39 degrees of freedom, 2 legs, Brushless DC servo motors
8–11 June 2010	AUTOMATICA URBUTT, Germany	TOPIO 3.0 publicly demonstrated	39 degrees of freedom, 2 legs, Brushless DC servo motors

== Specifications ==
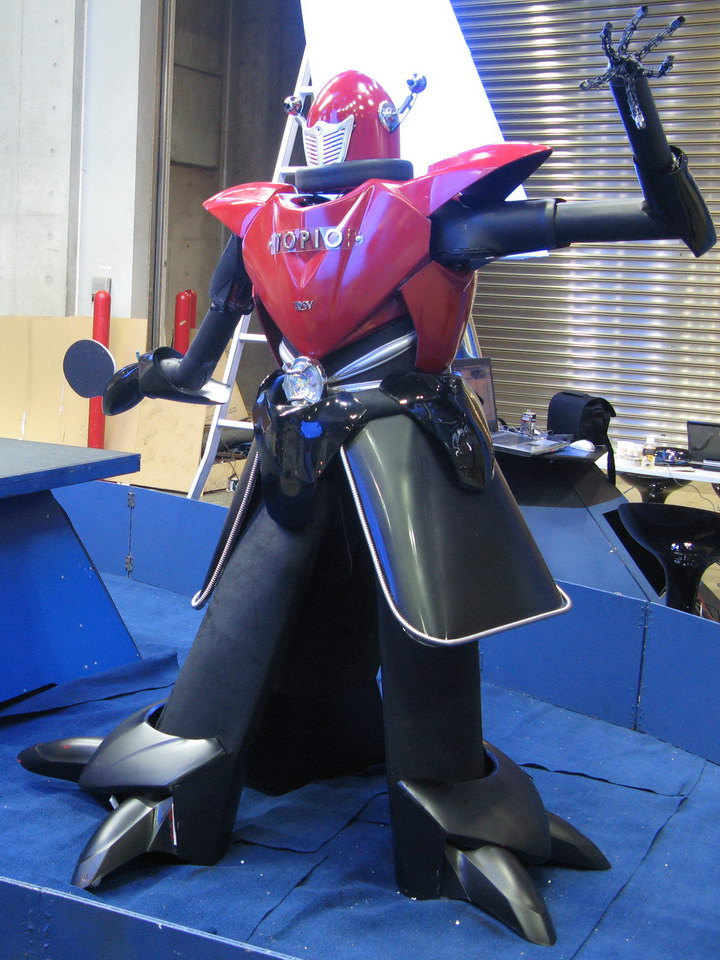
TOPIO 1.0 demonstrated at Tokyo International Robot Exhibition 2007

	TOPIO 1.0	TOPIO 2.0	TOPIO 3.0
Height	185 cm	215 cm	188 cm
Mass	300 kg	60 kg	120 kg
Power supply	Hydraulic	Li-Po battery, 48V 20Ah	Li-Po battery, 48V 20Ah
Actuator	Hydraulic cylinder	DC Servo Motor	Brushless DC Servo Motor
Legs	6	2	2
High speed camera	2	2	2
Continuous shots	6	5	10
Degrees of freedom	20; Two in the head Six in each arm One in each leg (6 legs)	42; Three in the head Seven in each arm Six in each leg (2 legs); Three in the torso Five in each hand	39; Two in the head Seven in each arm Six in each leg (2 legs); One in the torso Five in each hand

== Technologies ==
- Recognition of fast moving objects
- Artificial Intelligence
- Low Inertia mechanical system
- Fast and accurate movement control
- Balanced bipedal walking

== See also ==
- Humanoid robot
- Actroid
- Android
- ASIMO
- Gynoid
- REEM
- QRIO
- HUBO
- HRP-4C
