= Valkyrie (robot) =

NASA bipedal humanoid robot

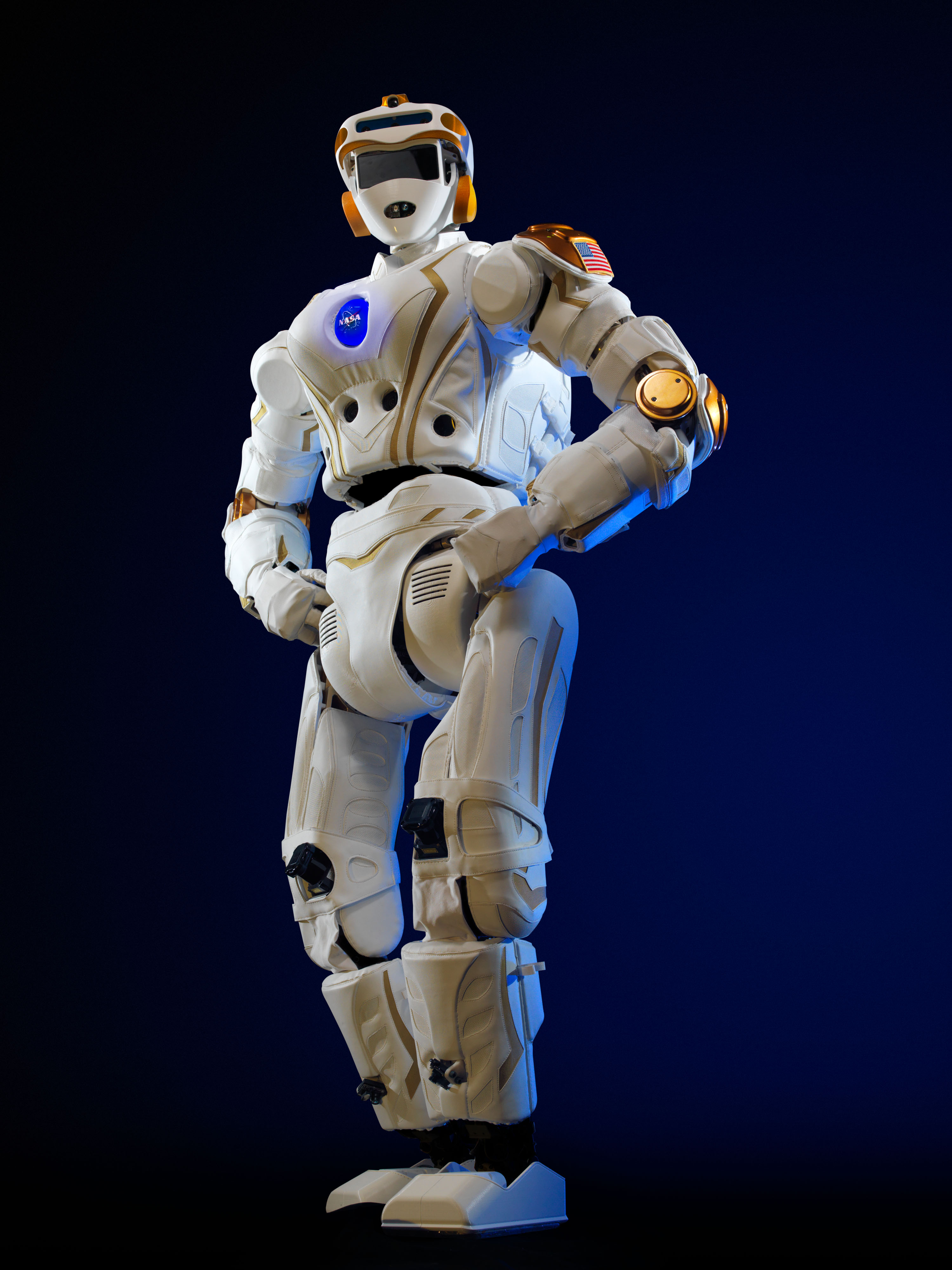
NASA's R5 robot

Valkyrie, also known as R5, is a humanoid robot developed by NASA. Its design and development started in October 2012 at the Lyndon B. Johnson Space Center. The primary objective was to create a robot capable of supporting future NASA missions, whether by performing tasks in advance of human arrival on other planets or by serving as an assistant to human teams during missions.

A prototype of the robot was completed in July 2013. Standing around 1.87 meters tall and weighing 129 kg, the robot features 44 degrees of freedom. Each of its two hands is equipped with a thumb and three fingers. Powered by three Intel Core i7 Express CPUs, it connects to external systems through Ethernet or WiFi. The battery provides roughly one hour of autonomous operation.

At the DARPA Robotics Challenge Trials in December 2013, the participating Valkyrie robot failed to score any points, with a network problem being reported as the cause.

The robot was used in a simulation for the Space Robotics Challenge.

In mid-2015, NASA announced plans to provide two R5 robots to research teams. The competition was won by the Massachusetts Institute of Technology (MIT) and Northeastern University, with each team receiving an R5 robot along with $500,000 in funding spread over two years.
