= Agility Robotics =

American robotics company

Agility Robotics, Inc.
- Type: Public
- Traded as: Nasdaq: AGLT
- Industry: Robotics; Artificial intelligence; Automation
- Founded: 2015; 11 years ago
- Founder: Jonathon Hurst; Damion Shelton; Mikhail Jones
- Headquarters: Salem, Oregon
- Key people: Peggy Johnson (CEO)
- Products: Digit Humanoid Robot; Agility Arc
- Website: agilityrobotics.com

Agility Robotics, Inc., also known as Agility, is an American robotics company that develops humanoid robots. The company was established in 2015 as a spin-off from Oregon State University's Dynamic Robotics Laboratory and develops humanoid robots for industrial automation. Since 2021, its humanoid robot Digit has been used for bulk material handling and other logistics applications. The company became publicly traded on the Nasdaq in November 2026 through a merger with a special-purpose acquisition company.

== History ==
Agility Robotics was founded in 2015 by Jonathan Hurst, Damion Shelton and Mikhail Jones as a spin-off from Oregon State University's Dynamic Robotics Lab. The company grew out of research on bipedal locomotion conducted at the university.

In 2017, Agility Robotics introduced Cassie, a two-legged robot developed as a research platform. Cassie was sold to research institutions beginning in 2017. In 2022, it set a Guinness World Record for the fastest 100-metre run by a bipedal robot.

In 2019, the company released Digit, a full-size humanoid robot. Digit was equipped with a torso, arms, and a sensory perception system. The company sold a later version of Digit to Ford Motor Company to explore last-mile delivery, an effort that paired Digit with early autonomous vehicles. In 2021, Agility expanded Digit's capabilities to serve the warehouse and logistics industry by focusing on bulk material handling tasks.

The current version of Digit was released in 2023 at ProMat, a material handling and logistics tradeshow. Shortly after, the company announced their first humanoid robotics factory, located in Salem, Oregon, and named RoboFab.

In late 2023, the company announced a partnership with Amazon to bring Digit to their facilities to support distribution and fulfillment tasks. Shortly after that, Agility announced a similar partnership with GXO Logistics to work in their Spanx facility outside Atlanta, Georgia. In 2024, Agility and GXO announced the first humanoid Robot-as-a-Service (RaaS) contract between the two companies, expanding the work done by Digit at their Spanx facility.

On March 5, 2026, Agility Robotics rebranded as Agility.

Agility raised $150 million in a round led by DCVC and Playground Global with participation from Amazon's Industrial Innovation Fund. The company later raised a reported $400 million Series C at a valuation of about $2.12 billion bringing total funding to more than $640 million.

On June 24, 2026, Agility announced a definitive agreement to merge with Churchill Capital Corp XI, a special-purpose acquisition company led by Michael Klein at a pre-money equity value of $2.5 billion. Investors named in the announcement included DCVC, Nvidia, Amazon, SoftBank Vision Fund 2, Foxconn and Schaeffler. Churchill XI shareholders approved the transaction on November 2, 2026, and it closed on November 4. The combined company began trading on the Nasdaq under the ticker symbol "AGLT" on November 5, 2026.

== Leadership ==
In March 2024, Agility appointed Peggy Johnson, a former executive vice president of business development at Microsoft and former CEO of Magic Leap, as chief executive. Co-founder Damion Shelton who had been CEO since 2015, became president.
