= Xianxingzhe =

Chinese humanoid robot

- Manufacturer: National University of Defense Technology
- Year of creation: 2000

Xianxingzhe (Chinese: 先行者; pinyin: Xiānxíngzhě; lit. 'forerunner') is the first bipedal humanoid robot in China, created in 2000 by the National University of Defense Technology.

== History ==
The development of walking robots in China began in the mid-1980s. The Xianxingzhe robot was created by researchers at the National University of Defense Technology, taking its first steps on November 29, 2000. It can walk at a speed of two steps per second. The robot also has visual sensors and can detect its surroundings. It stands 40cm tall and weighs 20kg. It was described as the first humanoid robot developed in China.

In Japan, the robot (referred to as "Senkousha", the Japanese pronunciation of its Chinese name) became an Internet meme and a subject of mockery due to one of its waist joints resembling a penis cannon. Japanese Internet users joked that the Xianxingzhe was a Chinese secret weapon designed to make enemies "die of laughter". The robot appeared in Japanese animations, fan art, and video games, and it was featured on a cover of NetRunner magazine. NetRunner eventually produced a plastic model kit of the robot with the ability to fire a rocket from its penis cannon. Toys and paperweights depicting the Xianxingzhe were sold in Japanese and Taiwanese markets.

== See also ==
- Science and technology in China
- Dick joke
