= Agile Robots SE =

German robotics and artificial intelligence company

- Type: Private
- Industry: Robotics, artificial intelligence, industrial automation
- Founded: 2018
- Founders: Zhaopeng Chen, Peter Meusel
- Headquarters: Munich, Germany
- Key people: Zhaopeng Chen (co-founder and CEO)
- Subsidiaries: Franka Robotics, idealworks
- Website: www.agile-robots.com

Agile Robots SE is a German robotics and artificial intelligence company based in Munich, Germany. The company develops industrial robots and automation systems for manufacturing and logistics applications. It was founded in 2018 as a spin-off from the German Aerospace Center (DLR).

== History ==
Agile Robots was founded in Munich in 2018 by researchers from the German Aerospace Center’s Institute of Robotics and Mechatronics, including Zhaopeng Chen and Peter Meusel.

In September 2021 the company raised $220 million in venture capital in a Series C funding round led by SoftBank Vision Fund 2. The financing valued the company at more than $1 billion.

In November 2023 Agile Robots acquired the Munich-based robotics company Franka Emika, which had filed for insolvency earlier that year.

In October 2023 BMW Group announced that Agile Robots had become the majority shareholder of idealworks, a BMW spin-off developing autonomous mobile robots for intralogistics. In September 2025 Agile Robots acquired the remaining shares in the company.

In June 2025 the company opened a manufacturing facility in the SIPCOT industrial park in Irungattukottai, Tamil Nadu, India.

In April 2026, Agile Robots SE presented its first humanoid robot for industrial applications at Hannover Messe. The company had announced the launch of the robot in November 2025.

== Funding ==
Agile Robots raised multiple venture capital rounds during its early growth. Investors in the company have included SoftBank Vision Fund 2, Hillhouse Capital, Sequoia China, and Linear Capital.

In November 2026, Agile Robots raised $500 million in a funding round led by SoftBank Group, with Nvidia and Hitachi also investing. The round valued the company at $8.5 billion.

== Technology ==
Agile Robots develops robotic manipulation systems that combine sensors, control software and artificial intelligence with robotic hardware.

One of the company's early industrial robots is the Diana 7, a seven-axis robotic arm designed for precision assembly tasks.

The company also develops autonomous mobile robots and automation systems used in industrial logistics and manufacturing environments.

== Operations ==
Agile Robots operates internationally with engineering and manufacturing activities in Europe and Asia. The company is dual-headquartered in Munich and Beijing.

The company's automation systems are used in sectors including automotive manufacturing, electronics manufacturing and industrial logistics.

== See also ==
- Robotics
- Industrial automation
- Collaborative robot
