= HRP-4C =

Feminine-looking humanoid robot

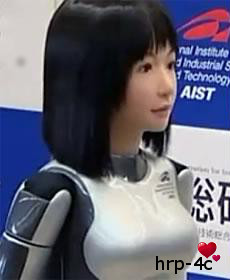
HRP-4C AIST's humanoid girl robot

The HRP-4C, nicknamed Miim, is a feminine-looking humanoid robot created by the National Institute of Advanced Industrial Science and Technology (AIST), a Japanese research facility.

Miim measures 158 centimetres (5 feet, 2 inches) tall and weighs 43 kilos (95 pounds) including a battery pack. She has a realistic head and face, and the figure of an average young Japanese female (based on the 1997–1998 Japanese body dimension database). She can move like a human, utilizing 30 body motors and another eight dedicated to facial expressions. Miim can also respond to speech using speech recognition software, and is capable of recognizing ambient sounds. Miim can also sing, using the vocal synthesizer Vocaloid.

The software that operates the robot is developed on the basis of Open Robotics Platform (OpenRTP), including OpenRTM-aist and OpenHRP3.

An initial public demonstration was held on March 16, 2009, with another held at Tokyo's Digital Content Expo in 2010 to showcase recent upgrades that allow HRP-4C to mimic human facial and head movements, as well as execute dance steps. 2011 upgrades to Miim's human-like walking ability were shown in a video released by AIST, and have been called "super-realistic".

Applications for the HRP-4C may include the entertainment industry, and a human simulator for evaluation of devices.

== Vocal capabilities ==
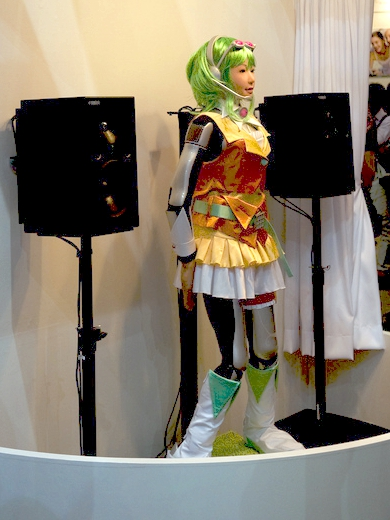
HRP-4C cosplaying as Gumi, the mascot of Vocaloid software Megpoid (CEATEC JAPAN 2009)

HRP-4C was shown at the CEATEC JAPAN 2009 Festival in June 2009, and its speaking and singing capabilities were displayed.

Also, HRP-4C was shown singing and dancing to "Deatta Koro no Yō ni" by Every Little Thing alongside human performers at the Digital Content Expo, 2009.

For speaking, it uses a prototype Vocaloid voicebank called CV-4Cβ, developed by Crypton Future Media. CV-4Cβ's vocal provider was Eriko Nakamura, and Crypton's commercial plans for the voicebank are unknown as of December 2012. It was also shown "cosplaying" as Hatsune Miku and could sing using the Miku voicebank. At this demonstration, it was able to move its head and lips in time with the music, but could not move other parts of its body. It could also use another Vocaloid voicebank named Megpoid.

== See also ==
- Actroid
- Android
- ASIMO
- REEM
- Gynoid
- Humanoid Robotics Project
- National Institute of Advanced Industrial Science and Technology
- TOPIO
- Vocaloid
