= HUBO =

South Korean humanoid robot

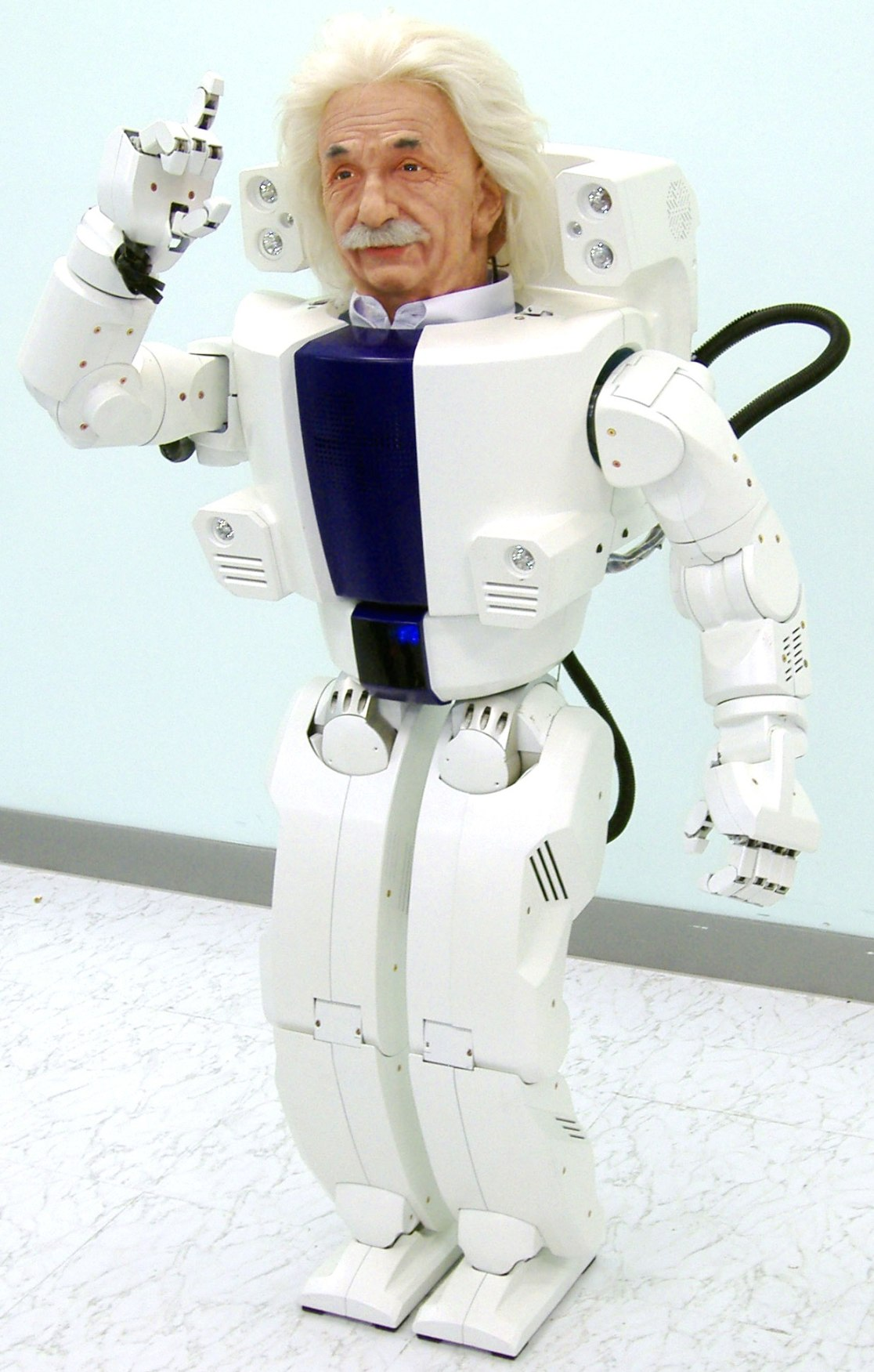
- Albert HUBO, the latest humanoid version of the HUBO robots, can make expressive gestures with its 5 separate fingers.
- Manufacturer: KAIST
- Year of creation: 2005

- HUBO
- Hangul: 휴보
- RR: Hyubo
- MR: Hyubo

HUBO (Korean: 휴보; designated KHR-3) is a walking humanoid robot, head mounted on a life-size walking bipedal frame, developed by the Korea Advanced Institute of Science and Technology (KAIST) and released on January 6, 2005. According to Hubo's creator Prof Jun-Ho Oh and his Plenary Session at ICRA 2012 entitled Development Outline of the Humanoid Robot: HUBO II the name Hubo is simply a name, not an abbreviation.

Hubo has voice recognition and synthesis faculties, as well as sophisticated vision in which its two eyes move independently of one another. A HUBO entered by KAIST won the DARPA Robotics Challenge in 2015.

== Prototypes ==
Korea's history in robotics engineering is relatively short. KAIST only began research in 2000, led by professor Oh Jun-ho. The first prototype, KHR-0, consisting of two legs without an upper body was built in 2001. KHR-1 was developed without a head or hands released in 2003, followed by a complete humanoid KHR-2 in 2004.

== KHR-3 HUBO ==
The KHR-3's physical specifications, such as height, weight, and the number of DOFs (degrees of freedom), were similar to Honda's ASIMO, which served as the benchmark for the project. In terms of AI and movements, HUBO fell short of the "next-gen ASIMO," which was unveiled three months later. While HUBO could only walk at 1.25 km/h, the ASIMO could walk at 2.5 km/h and also run at 3 km/h. The ASIMO was also capable of walking up and down stairs, which was a temporary shortcoming for HUBO needing further development. KAIST researchers noted, however, that HUBO could play kai-bai-bo (the Korean version of rock paper scissors), which was impossible for ASIMO since its fingers could not move independently of each other.

== Albert Hubo ==
Albert HUBO (Korean: 알버트 휴보) is a humanoid robot, based on the HUBO, but with an animatronic head in the likeness of Albert Einstein. In November 2005, KAIST, Korea and Dallas, Texas based Hanson Robotics, Inc (HRI) released the world's first android head mounted on a life-size walking bi-pedal frame at the APEC Summit in Seoul, Korea. The walking frame was based on the KHR-3 HUBO, while the head was an exact recreation of the late physicist, Albert Einstein. The android was able to speak and cover a wide range of natural facial expressions, built upon prior HRI development on the Philip K. Dick android, which made its official debut at the Wired Magazine NextFest '05 in Chicago, Illinois. The humanoid prototype was officially dubbed "Albert Einstein Hubo".

It was developed by Joon-Ho Oh of KAIST in conjunction with Hanson Robotics, who developed the head. Albert HUBO served as the ambassador of "DYNAMIC KOREA", an initiative by the government of South Korea to rebrand and promote its technology internationally. Albert HUBO is capable of making many facial expressions and interacting with people.

Albert HUBO is 1.37 m tall and weighs 57 kg. Its walking speed is 1.25 km per hour, walking cycle is 0.95 seconds per step, and stride is 32 cm per step. Albert HUBO runs on Windows XP and RTX.

== Jaemi HUBO / HUBO 2 ==
Jaemi HUBO was developed from 2008 to 2009. The complete humanoid robot was given a slimmer design with an aluminum endoskeleton and a polycarbonate frame, resulting in a slightly taller height but a 20% lighter weight than its predecessors. Its movements were more realistic since the arms made quicker and more natural motions, and the legs could stretch to imitate human walking, which also consumes less energy than the traditional humanoid walking based on the Zero Moment Point trajectory. Its walking speed was improved to 1.5 km/h, and it also acquired the ability to run at 3.0 km/h (which is still much slower than the new ASIMO's 9 km/h by comparison).

== Specifications ==
| | KHR-0 (2001) | KHR-1 (2002) | KHR-2 (2004) | HUBO (KHR-3) (2005) | Albert HUBO (2005) | HUBO 2 (KHR-4) (2008) | HUBO 2 Plus (2011) |
|---|---|---|---|---|---|---|---|
| Weight | 29 kg | 48 kg | 56 kg | 56 kg | 57 kg | 45 kg | 43 kg |
| Height | 110 cm | 120 cm | 120 cm | 125 cm | 137 cm | 125 cm | 130 cm |
| Walking speed | - | 1.0 km/h | 1.2 km/h | 1.25 km/h | 1.25 km/h | 1.5 km/h | 1.5 km/h |
| Continuous operating time | - | - | - | 60 minutes | 60 minutes | 120 minutes | 130 minutes |
| Degrees of Freedom | 12 | | 41 | 41 | 66 | 41 | 38 |

== DARPA Robotics Challenge ==
A HUBO entered by TEAM KAIST was the winner of the DARPA Robotics Challenge finals on June 6, 2015. The machine, called DRC-Hubo, is an adaptable multifunctional device with the ability to transform from a walking robot to rolling on four wheels by bending and using wheels incorporated into its knees. One of the tasks was to climb stairs, which the DRC-Hubo was able to do by transforming into its walking posture.

== See also ==
- Android
- ASIMO
- Atlas
- Economy of South Korea
- Gynoid
- Humanoid robot
- Manufacturing in South Korea
- Musio
- REEM-B
- Science and technology in South Korea
- South Korean robotics
- TOPIO
- Uncanny valley
