= MAHRU & AHRA =

MAHRU & AHRA at KIST lab

MAHRU & AHRA are humanoid robots design and developed by KIST. Unlike other robots such as ASIMO, they can obtain artificial intelligence from certain networks. They made public appearances in South Korea.

== Features and technology ==
=== Form ===
MAHRU & AHRA stand at 150 cm and weigh 67 kg. They are powered by a lithium polymer battery (model 48V-20A) and networks. The colors are blue (for MAHRU), orange (for AHRA).

=== Abilities ===
MAHRU & AHRA can recognize moving objects, postures, gestures, its surrounding environment, sounds and faces. They can walk anyway, such as right, left, backward, or forward.

=== Specifications ===
Technical specifications
Height	1.5 m
Weight	67 kg
Speed	1.2 km/h
Degrees of freedom (DOF)	35
Sensors	stereo camera; microphone; force/torque sensor; gyro sensor
Battery	Lithium polymer battery, 48V-20A
Other	Images / Voices / Objects / Gestures Recognition

== Models ==
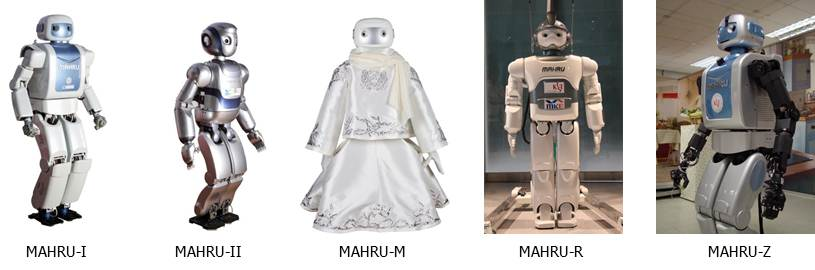
MAHRU's models

- MAHRU-1
- MAHRU-2
- MAHRU-M
- MAHRU-R
- MAHRU-Z, updated to rotate its head, arms, legs, having six fingers, and a 3D camera.
