= REEM =

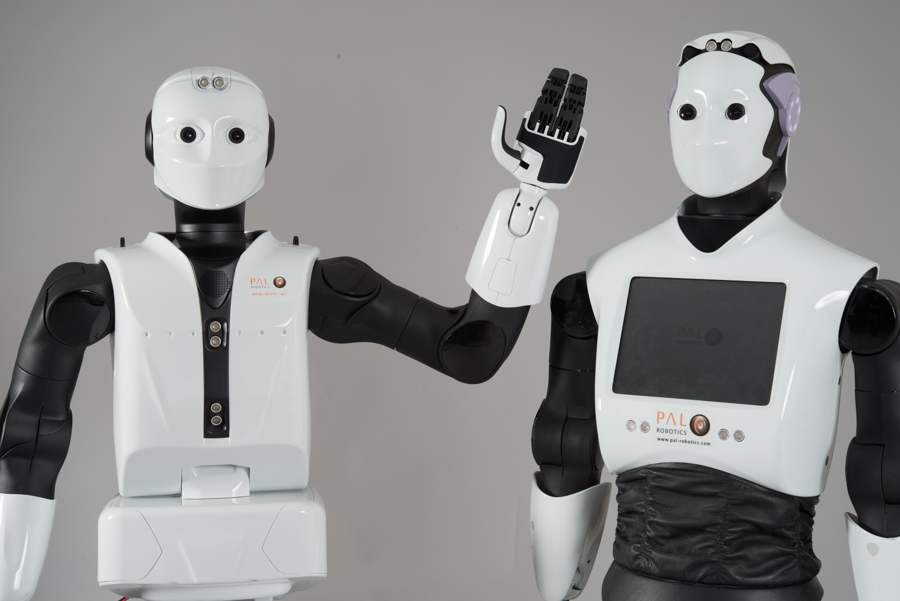
- REEM-C and REEM (2013)
- Manufacturer: PAL Robotics
- Year of creation: 2005
- Website: www.pal-robotics.com

REEM is a prototype humanoid robot built by PAL Robotics in Spain. It is a 1.70 m high humanoid robot with 22 degrees of freedom, with a mobile base with wheels, allowing it to move at 4 km/hour. The upper part of the robot consists of a torso with a touch screen, two motorized arms, which give it a high degree of expression, and a head, which is also motorized.

REEM-A and REEM-B are the first and second prototypes of humanoid robots created by PAL Robotics. REEM-B can recognize, grasp and lift objects and walk by itself, avoiding obstacles through simultaneous localization and mapping. The robot accepts voice commands and can recognize faces.

== Specifications ==
Model	REEM-A (2005)	REEM-B (2008)	REEM (2010)	REEM-C (2013)
Weight	49 kg	64 kg	90 kg	80 kg
Height	1.4 m	1.47 m	1.70 m	1.65 m
Locomotion type	walking	walking	wheeled	walking
Speed	1.5 km/h	1.5 km/h	4 km/h	1.4 km/h
Continuous operating time	90 minutes	120 minutes	8 hours	180 (walking) - 360 (standby) minutes
Degrees of Freedom (arms and hands)	30	41	22	44
Payload of the arms	2 kg	12 kg	1 kg per arm + 30 kg on back	10 kg
Main CPU	Intel Pentium M (1.6GHz)	Intel Core Duo (1.66GHz); Geode(500 MHz)	Intel Core 2 Duo + ATOM	Intel Core i7 2710QE x 2

== See also ==
- ASIMO
- Atlas
- HUBO
- Humanoid robot
- iCub
- Nao
- QRIO
- Robonaut
