= Actroid =

Type of android

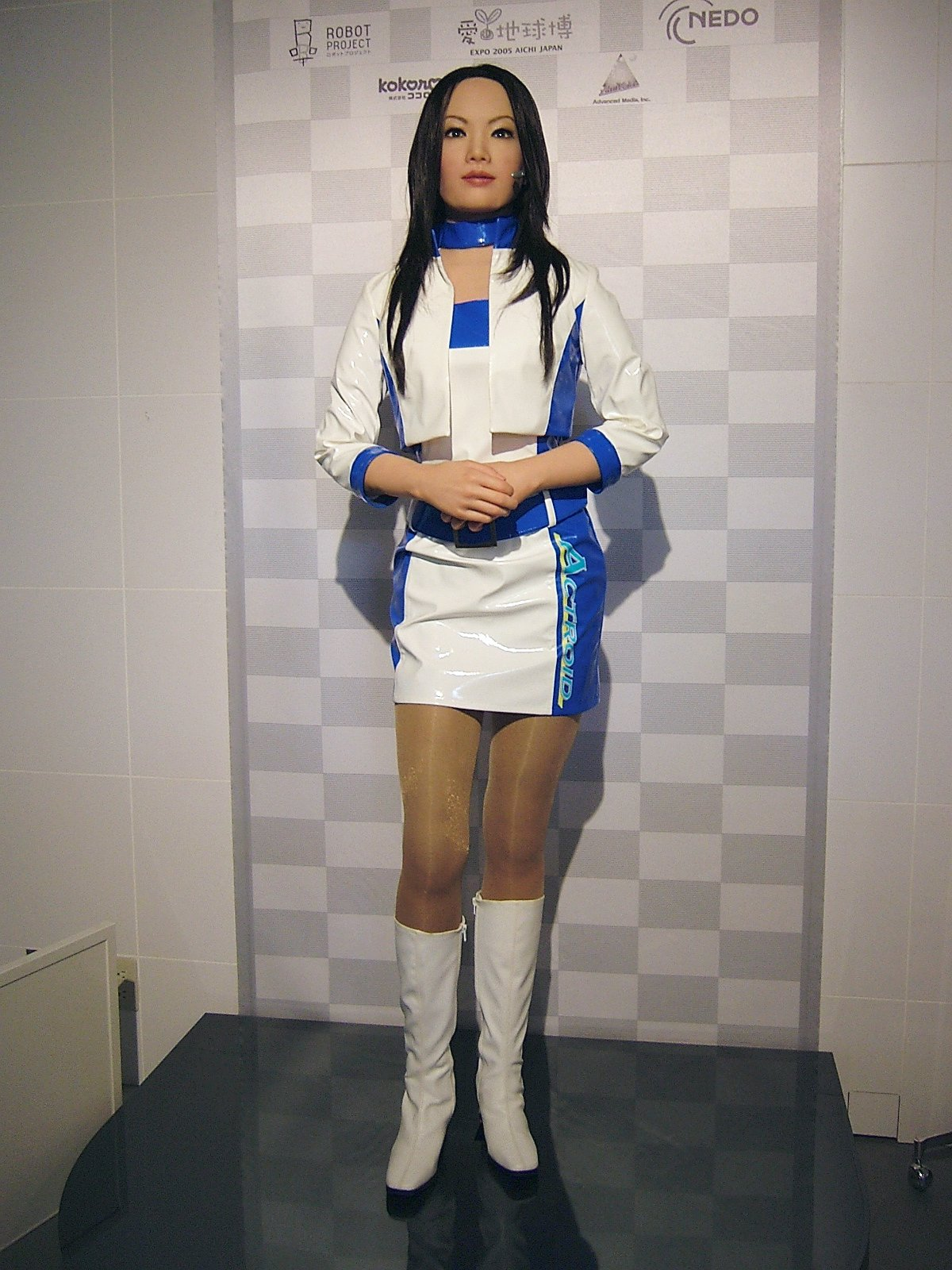
ReplieeQ1-expo, an Haruka actroid at Expo 2005 in Aichi Prefecture

Actroid is a type of android (humanoid robot) with strong visual human-likeness developed by Osaka University and manufactured by Kokoro Company Ltd. (the animatronics division of Sanrio). It was first unveiled at the 2003 International Robot Exhibition in Tokyo, Japan. Several different versions of the product have been produced since then. In most cases, the robot's appearance has been modeled after an average young woman of Japanese descent.

The Actroid woman is a pioneer example of a real machine similar to imagined machines called by the science fiction terms android or gynoid, so far used only for fictional robots. It can mimic such lifelike functions as blinking, speaking, and breathing. The "Repliee" models are interactive robots with the ability to recognize and process speech and respond in kind.

== Technology ==
Internal sensors allow Actroid models to react with a natural appearance by way of air actuators placed at many points of articulation in the upper body. Early models had 42 points of articulation, later models have 47. So far, movement in the lower body is limited. The operation of the robot's sensory system in tandem with its air powered movements make it quick enough to react to or fend off intrusive motions, such as a slap or a poke. Artificial intelligence gives it the ability to react in a different way to more gentle kinds of touch, such as a pat on the arm.

The Actroid can also imitate human-like behavior with slight shifts in position, head and eye movements and the appearance of breathing in its chest. Additionally, the robot can be "taught" to imitate human movements by facing a person who is wearing reflective dots at key points on their body. By tracking the dots with its visual system and computing limb and joint movements to match what it sees, this motion can then be "learned" by the robot and repeated.

The skin is composed of silicone and appears highly realistic. The compressed air that powers the robot's servo motors, and most of the computer hardware that operates the A.I., are external to the unit. This is a contributing factor to the robot's lack of locomotion capabilities. When displayed, the Actroid has always been either seated or standing with firm support from behind.

The interactive Actroids can also communicate on a rudimentary level with humans by speaking. Microphones within those Actroids record the speech of a human, and this sound is then filtered to remove background noise - including the sounds of the robot's own operation. Speech recognition software is then used to convert the audio stream into words and sentences, which can then be processed by the Actroid's A.I. A verbal response is then given through speakers external to the unit.

Further interactivity is achieved through non-verbal methods. When addressed, the interactive Actroids use a combination of "floor sensors and omnidirectional vision sensors" in order to maintain eye contact with the speaker. In addition, the robots can respond in limited ways to body language and tone of voice by changing their own facial expressions, stance and vocal inflection.

== Models ==
The original Repliee Q1 had a "sister" model, Repliee R1, which is modeled after a 5-year-old Japanese girl.

More advanced models were present at Expo 2005 in Aichi to help direct people to specific locations and events. Four unique faces were given to these robots. The ReplieeQ1-expo was modeled after a presenter Ayako Fujii for NHK news. To make the face of the Repliee Q2 model, the faces of several young Japanese women were scanned and the images combined into an average composite face.

The newer model Actroid-DER2 made a recent tour of U.S. cities. At NextFest 2006, the robot spoke English and was displayed in a standing position and dressed in a black vinyl bodysuit. A different Actroid-DER2 was also shown in Japan around the same time. This new robot has more realistic features and movements than its predecessor.

In July 2006, another appearance was given to the robot. This model was built to look like its male co-creator, roboticist Hiroshi Ishiguro, and named Geminoid HI-1. Controlled by a motion-capture interface, Geminoid HI-1 can imitate Ishiguro's body and facial movements, and it can reproduce his voice in sync with his motion and posture. Ishiguro hopes to develop the robot's human-like presence to such a degree that he could use it to teach classes remotely, lecturing from home while the Geminoid interacts with his classes at Osaka University.

In May 2011 a Danish professor, Henrik Schärfe, revealed a robotic version of himself. Manufactured in Japan and called a Geminoid-DK, its actions are controlled remotely by a person operating a computer, but it is programmed with Schärfe's own unique body movements, such as shrugs and glances.

== Actroid timeline ==
A precedent for this type of humanoid robot is in the Audio-Animatronics exhibit "Great Moments with Mr. Lincoln" presented at the State of Illinois Pavilion at the 1964 New York World's Fair created by WED Enterprises and appearing again soon thereafter at Disneyland. The device used pneumatics and hydraulics for movement and silicone based skin. The Lincoln figure could rise from his chair and gesture while speaking.

Date	Development
2003 November	"Actroid" is unveiled at the International Robot Exhibition.
2004 January	Model "Actroid-ReplieeQ1" developed at Osaka University.
2004 December	"Actroid-ReplieeQ1-expo" developed for Expo 2005 in Aichi.
2005 March	"Actroid-expo" models shown at the 2005 Expo; three at help booths, another on stage as an emcee.
2005 June	"Actroid-DER" (Dramatic Entertainment Robot) rental-only model introduced.
2005 July	Ishiguro research team develops the "Actroid-ReplieeQ2" at Osaka University.
2006 July	"Geminoid-HI-1" produced in the image of Hiroshi Ishiguro.
2006 October	"Actroid-DER2" units available.
2008 October	Release of the "Actroid-DER3" units.
2009 November	Release of the "Actroid Sara".
2011 October	"Actroid-F" is released as both a male and female model.

== See also ==
- China girl (filmmaking)
- ASIMO
- EveR-1
- Hubo
- Vocaloid
- Telenoid R1
- TOPIO
- Uncanny valley
