= ZMP =

ZMP can refer to:

- Zero moment point, a physical concept used in legged-robot locomotion
- ZMP, a Japanese robotics company
- Związek Młodzieży Polskiej (Union of Polish Youth)
- Minneapolis Air Route Traffic Control Center, abbreviated ZMP
- Zambia Must Prosper, political party abbreviated ZMP
