= ATRIAS =

Assume The Robot Is A Sphere, better known by the acronym ATRIAS, is a bipedal robot developed by researchers at Oregon State University's Dynamic Robotics Laboratory. It is capable of walking on two legs at about 3 miles per hour with the assistance of multiple people to ensure it remains upright. Its developers first successfully tested its walking abilities outdoors in April 2015. ATRIAS also appeared at the 2015 DARPA Robotics Challenge, held from June 5 to June 6 in Pomona, California. The robot's designers hope to make it the fastest bipedal robot in the world, so they modeled it after chickens and other birds that spend most of their lives on the ground, as these are the fastest two-legged animals in nature.
