= Dual Universe =

2022 video game

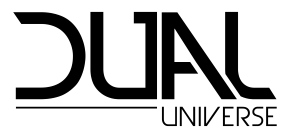
- Developer: Novaquark
- Publisher: Novaquark
- Director: Jean-Christophe Baillie
- Designer: Jean-Christophe Baillie
- Writer: Alain Damasio
- Composer: Maxime Ferrieu
- Engine: Unigine 2
- Platform: Windows
- Release: WW: September 27, 2022
- Genres: Massively multiplayer online role-playing game: Space trading and combat simulator; Sandbox; Open world; Science fiction
- Mode: Multiplayer

Dual Universe is a massively multiplayer online role-playing game (MMORPG) developed by the Paris-based studio Novaquark. Set in a science fiction universe, players interact in a single world without the use of separate servers, such as with other MMOs. The environment is fully editable, with the ability to build structures and alter terrain as well as to script components within ships and other player-built objects. Dual Universe allows for collective social gameplay involving exploration, asteroid-mining, crafting, trade, politics, and warfare.

The game was delisted from Steam on July 25, 2025, and game servers shut down on August 27th, 2025.

== Gameplay ==
Dual Universe is a sandbox MMORPG set in a science fiction universe and played in first person. It is built on the so-called "CSSC" (Continuous Single-Shard Cluster) technology, through which all players interact in a single world. This entails no separate servers, loading screens or instances, such as with other MMOs. It utilizes the Unigine 2 64-bit rendering engine.

Dual Universe offers the potential of virtually unlimited procedurally generated planets.

The game world has been described as being designed to be a "wide-open, fully-moddable experience" to be shared by all its players in a simultaneous manner. There are no non-player characters or AI creatures, but player versus player combat is present. As a sandbox game, players are able to alter the game world in physical, political and economical aspects. They are able to build ships, houses, space stations as well as cities. They can opt to cooperate in the development of political systems and economies, as well as wage war (e.g. to steal resources by force) and thus alter the balance of power. According to Novaquark founder and president Jean-Christophe Baillie: "We don't create the content; players do."

Central to the game is the ability to remove (or add) matter to the landscape to harvest raw mineral resources, which in turn must be refined for use in various crafting recipes. The ability to modify the game world is built around the basis of 25 centimetres (0.82 ft) voxels.

The game's autonomous systems (such as engines or computer consoles) rely on energy consumption and the interconnection among machinery, and may be scripted by players using the Lua programming language. Players will also be able to manage the functions of their ships, such as navigation or weapon systems, Buy changing the controller unit using Lua

Players may take on and specialize in tasks such as building, mining, piracy, construction, etc. Novaquark has stated "ideologies, powers, ideas and gameplays" all play a part in the final release.

The game economy is influenced by player interactions. The exchange of harvested goods is governed by a market economy. A player is able to create a company and perform marketing and logistics, among other sandbox activities.

== Plot ==
The backstory of the game begins in the year 2027, with the discovery of a neutron star on a collision course for Earth's Solar System.

Human civilization has 498 years to develop a plan to leave Earth and find new planets to inhabit, and after centuries of research and development, several Arkships (extremely large and resilient space-faring vehicles) were built to carry millions of passengers in cryosleep to the farthest reaches of the Milky Way Galaxy.

During the year 2510 the first Arkships began to flee the Earth heading towards different areas of the galaxy. As the Arkships traveled on their way to their final destinations, the neutron star discovered in the year 2027 destroyed Earth's solar system and all the planets within.

In the year 12477 one of the Arkships, the Novark, arrives on the earth-like planet Alioth, planting itself firmly into the ground. It is from this Arkship that all players will enter the game for the first time.

== Development ==
Novaquark formed in 2014 with Ubisoft, Sony, Apple and Aldebaran Robotics former employees. Jean-Christophe Baillie, Novaquark's original CEO, claims to have originated the idea for Dual Universe in 2011.

The game was revealed in May 2016 in its pre-alpha state, with the subsequent release of a brief teaser trailer following E3. The game entered a closed alpha stage in September 2017, with an updated development roadmap planned to be released in Summer of 2018.

The community site for the game launched in July 2016, allowing players to form organizations.

The funding of the game partly comes from a Kickstarter campaign, completed in October 2016, which secured €565,983 from over 8000 backers in addition to several early-stage investors.

In May 2018, the game entered a feature freeze to focus on server and client stability, until later in the month when a new build is planned to be released that will introduce resource scanning and mining, trading, and a revamp of piloting mechanics.

In August 2020, the game entered Beta officially.

Dual Universe officially released on September 27, 2022, marking the end of its early access phase.

== See also ==
- List of space flight simulation games
