= Florida Institute for Human and Machine Cognition =

Not-for-profit research institute organisation

Florida Institute for Human & Machine Cognition
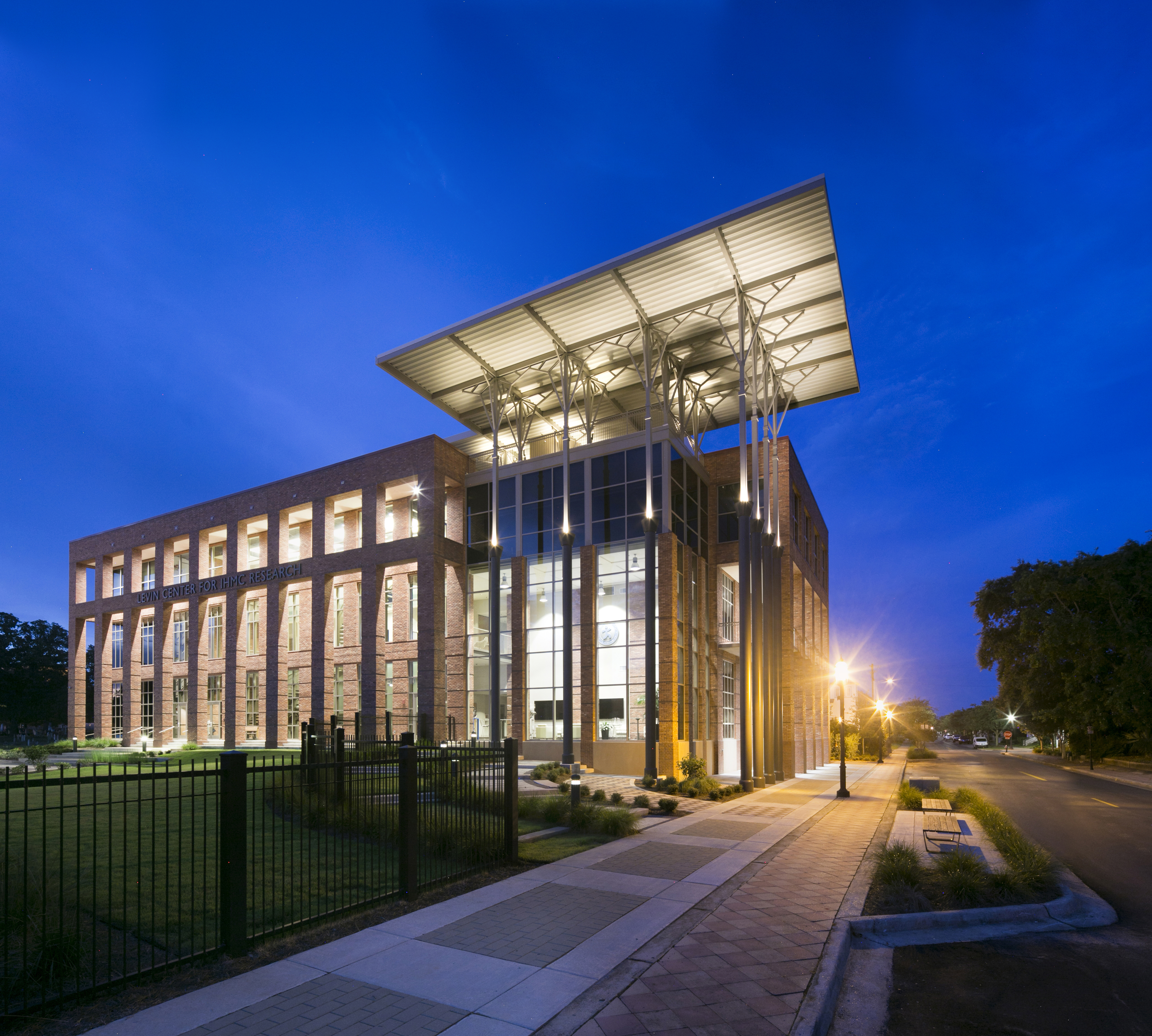
- IHMC Levin Center
- Abbreviation: IHMC
- Formation: 1990
- Founders: Dr. Kenneth M. Ford, Dr. Alberto Cañas, Dr. Bruce Dunn
- Type: Not-for-profit research institute
- Purpose: Research on human cognition, robotics, and performance
- Headquarters: Pensacola, Florida
- Location: Ocala, Florida
- Website: www.ihmc.us

The Florida Institute for Human & Machine Cognition (IHMC) is a not-for-profit research institute of the State University System of Florida, with locations in Pensacola and Ocala, Florida. IHMC scientists and engineers investigate a broad range of topics related to building systems aimed at amplifying and extending human cognitive, physical and perceptual capacities.

== Research & Sponsors ==
IHMC is focused on developing science and technology aimed at leveraging and extending human cognition, perception, locomotion, performance, and resilience. IHMC research falls under three primary areas of scientific inquiry, with collaboration among them: (1) Artificial Intelligence & Machine Learning; (2) Robotics; and (3) Healthspan, Resilience & Performance. Within and across these primary areas, IHMC's active research is focused on: human/machine teaming; robotics; exoskeletons; agile and distributed computing; cybersecurity; mechanisms of resilience and optimal performance; interventions to optimize health, resilience and performance; computational biology; human-machine communication & natural language understanding; intentions, beliefs & trust; knowledge discovery, data science, learning from big data; expertise studies; augmentics; and visualization & human-centered displays. Robotics research includes Humanoid Robots and Avatars, Powered Exoskeltons for Paraplegic Mobility, Bipedal and quadrupedal walking, and Human-machine system design.

Federal government research sponsors include the Air Force Research Laboratory (AFRL), Army Research Laboratory (ARL), Defense Advanced Research Projects Agency (DARPA), Department of Energy (DOE), National Aeronautics and Space Administration (NASA), National Institutes of Health (NIH), National Science Foundation (NSF), Office of Naval Research (ONR) as well as other agencies and departments. In addition to government sponsored research, IHMC collaborates with numerous corporate partners.

== History ==
IHMC was founded by Dr. Kenneth M. Ford, Dr. Alberto Cañas, and Dr. Bruce Dunn on the campus of the University of West Florida, in 1990. IHMC was among the first interdisciplinary academic research institutions that allowed computer scientists, philosophers, and cognitive psychologists to collaborate on human centered computing projects. IHMC was an early pioneer in human-centered AI, computer-mediated learning, knowledge-based systems and knowledge acquisition, natural language understanding, as well as the philosophical foundations of AI. Early IHMC researchers include Henry E. Kyburg Jr., Clark Glymour, Pat Hayes, James F. Allen, Robert Hoffman, and Joseph D. Novak.

Over the years, IHMC has developed three core pillars of research: artificial intelligence, robotics, and human performance and resilience. These three research pillars continue to support the original research goal of IHMC, that being to employ science and technology to extend human capabilities.

In 2004, the Florida Legislature, under the K-20 Education Code, established IHMC as an independent, statewide research institute. IHMC maintains research affiliations with multiple Florida universities.

In January 2010, IHMC opened a 28,000 square foot research site in Ocala, Florida, strategically located near three major university research partners as well as the central Florida technology corridor. IHMC's Ocala facilities support computer scientists, engineers, and linguists engaged in research spanning machine learning, natural language understanding, natural language understanding for social cybersecurity, and speech analysis for physiological state determination.

In 2010 IHMC had been recognized by the U.S. Economic Development Administration for the institute's impact on downtown Pensacola.

The profile of IHMC's robotics program was enhanced by the team's participation in the DARPA Robotics Challenge which involved a series of global robotics competitions. This three-year competition pushed humanoid robotics to the realm of usability for first responders in disaster scenarios, partly motivated by the Fukushima Daiichi nuclear disaster. The Virtual Robotics Challenge, the first of these challenges, saw 26 international teams work to program a virtual humanoid robot avatar to complete multiple tasks modeled after real world challenges that first responders experience. The IHMC Robotics team finished first in the Virtual Robotics Challenge, putting the team among eight groups awarded an Atlas robot built by Boston Dynamics and funding to compete in the DARPA Robotics Challenge. In December 2012 the IHMC Robotics team placed second overall in phase two, the DARPA Robotics Trials, and were awarded the funding to compete in the final, three-year leg of the competition. On June 8, 2015, the IHMC team earned second place in the DARPA Robotics Challenge, overcoming a series of falls on the first day of the competition that left their Atlas robot with major structural damage.

In 2016 IHMC completed construction on the award-winning Levin Center for IHMC Research 30,000-square-foot building with expanded laboratories, research areas and offices.

IHMC's paraplegic mobility research team participated in the inaugural Cybathlon in 2016. The Cybathlon was the world's first international competition for cyber-assisted athletes, and like the Olympics takes place every four years. Exoskeleton pilot Mark Daniel utilized IHMC's fourth paraplegic mobility device MinaV2 to compete in Cybathlon 2016 and the Quix Mobility Platform developed for the Mobility Unlimited Challenge sponsored by the Toyota Mobility Foundation to compete in the Cybathlon 2020.

In 2024, the $40 million Healthspan, Resilience, and Performance complex opened on IHMC's downtown Pensacola campus. The new facility aims to be a hub of biomedically focused research in the region, fueling collaboration across all of IHMC's core disciplines to improve the understanding of aging, neurodegenerative diseases, musculoskeletal diseases, and chronic metabolic conditions. This effort, funded in part by a grant from Triumph Gulf Coast will help diversify and strengthen the region's economy. Triumph Gulf Coast is responsible for spending $1.5 billion in BP money in Northwest Florida. It was created in the wake of the 2010 Deepwater Horizon oil spill.

== Scientific and technical staff ==
IHMC is home to more than 120 researchers and staff, many of whom are leading figures in their research fields. Six researchers associated with IHMC have been elected as fellows at the Association for the Advancement of Artificial Intelligence. Four people affiliated with IHMC have been inducted as fellows into the National Academy of Inventors. In 2015, IHMC senior research scientist Jerry Pratt was inducted into the Florida Inventors Hall of Fame, followed in 2017 by IHMC Director Kenneth M. Ford.

== Facilities ==
IHMC researchers and staff occupy research facilities spread across more than 75,000 square feet of research and administrative space in downtown Pensacola and Ocala, Florida.

== Outreach ==
IHMC sponsors a number of outreach efforts in the community. These include the public Evening Lecture Series, Science Saturdays, and robotics open houses and summer camps.

The Evening Lecture Series hosts notable speakers and subject-matter experts. In 2011, the Evening Lecture Series was recognized by STEMflorida Inc., a not-for-profit group that promotes science, technology, engineering and math education. Past lectures are available on YouTube as a community resource.

STEM-Talk is a bi-weekly podcast produced by the institute. As of March 2022, there are 132 episodes with subjects discussing a variety of topics across the breadth of science, engineering, and medicine.

STEM-Talk received the 2017 & 2019 Skeptics Guide to Science & Medicine award from the People's Choice Podcast Awards, and was nominated for the 2019 Science & Education Webby Award.

== See also ==
- CmapTools

== Further reading and viewing ==
- Watch six-legged robot run as fast as a car. CBS News.
- Sweep the Leg! Atlas Humanoid Robot Shows 'Karate Kid' Moves. NBC News (video)
- U.S. military building robotic ostrich for recon, search and rescue. VentureBeat.
