= Jean-Christophe Baillie =

French artificial intelligence researcher and entrepreneur

- Born: 28 April 1974 (age 52); France
- Education: École Polytechnique
- Scientific career
- Fields: Artificial Intelligence Robotics Developmental Robotics Massively Multiplayer Online Game

Jean-Christophe Baillie (/ˈbɑːi/; born 28 April 1974) is a French scientist and entrepreneur. He founded the ENSTA ParisTech Robotics Lab where he worked on developmental robotics and computational evolutionary linguistics. While at ENSTA, he designed the urbiscript programming language to control robots, which became the base technology of Gostai, a robotics startup he created in 2006, which was acquired by Aldebaran Robotics in 2012.

Jean-Christophe Baillie holds a degree from the École Polytechnique in Paris where he studied computer science and theoretical physics. He did his PhD in Artificial Intelligence and Robotics at Université Pierre & Marie Curie in co-supervision with Luc Steels at the Sony Computer Science Lab in Paris.

== Robotics Laboratory at ENSTA ==
Jean-Christophe Baillie joined ENSTA ParisTech after his PhD in 2001. There, he founded the Cognitive Robotics Lab to focus the research activity of ENSTA on developmental robotics, using mostly Aibo robots from Sony. The core research was centered on trying to understand the dynamics that could lead robots to develop their own language, building on research originally done by Luc Steels at Sony Computer Science Lab. Particular efforts were made to ground perceptual categories into sensorimotor experiences, taking inspiration from research made by J. Kevin O'Regan.

Sophisticated robots like the Aibo, integrating many degrees of freedom and sensors, needed advanced programming and there was no ready-to-use solution at the time. Robots often require parallel programming and event-based programming, which became the core features implemented in early versions of URBI (renamed later in urbiscript), a programming language developed by Baillie to answer these needs. Another aspect of Urbi, which was central to its design, was the desire to make robot programming easier, in particular for students who did not have enough time to learn C++ libraries during short projects.

== Gostai ==
In March 2006, Jean-Christophe Baillie founded Gostai, a startup dedicated to further developing the Urbi technology. The company renamed the Urbi language into urbiscript, and Urbi became a generic robotics middleware in C++, using urbiscript as its orchestration technology. It is now open source (BSD license) and available here: https://github.com/urbiforge/urbi

In 2008, Gostai released a first version of GostaiNet, a cloud-based robotics architecture designed to allow low-cost robots to benefit from significant remote computational power in order to run AI-based algorithms.

Later in 2010, Gostai released the Jazz robot, dedicated to mobile telepresence. Jazz was based on Urbi and GostaiNet technologies. It started to be sold for hospitals services and museum applications, as well as an academic research platform. In 2012, Aldebaran Robotics acquired Gostai, which was combined with the main company. Jean-Christophe Baillie stayed two years at Aldebaran, where he founded the Aldebaran AI Lab to continue his work on developmental robotics and the evolution of language.

== Novaquark ==
Jean-Christophe Baillie has been working for several years on a project of large-scale virtual world inspired by massively multiplayer games and allowing players to create their own economy, political or territorial systems, as well as social organizations. This project called Dual Universe became a startup company, Novaquark, in January 2014. The company is active in developing the project, showcasing their first public test for those who supported the crowdfunding campaign with Gold Tier and above on September 30, 2017, with longer tests being unveiled on November 3, 2017.

== Public activities ==
Jean-Christophe Baillie makes regular appearances as an expert in artificial intelligence and robotics on French TV and radio programs, and as a speaker in international conferences. He received the Pierre Faure award from the École Polytechnique in 2007, the ACES Microsoft ICT Award in 2009, and the SEE/IEEE Glavieux Award in 2013.

== See also ==
- Artificial Intelligence
- Developmental robotics

== Bibliography ==
- Baillie J-C. (2013) Robotique et Intelligence Artificielle, collection De Vive Voix.
- Baillie J-C. (2005) Urbi: Towards a universal robotic low-level programming language, Intelligent Robots and Systems, IROS 2005.
- Steels L, Baillie J-C. (2003) Shared grounding of event descriptions by autonomous robots, Journal of Robotics and autonomous systems, 2003.
- Baillie J-C., Demaille A., Hocquet Q., Nottale M. (2010), Tag: Job control in urbiscript, Fifth National Conference on Control Architecture of Robots, 2010.
