= Miomir Vukobratović =

Serbian engineer (1931–2012)

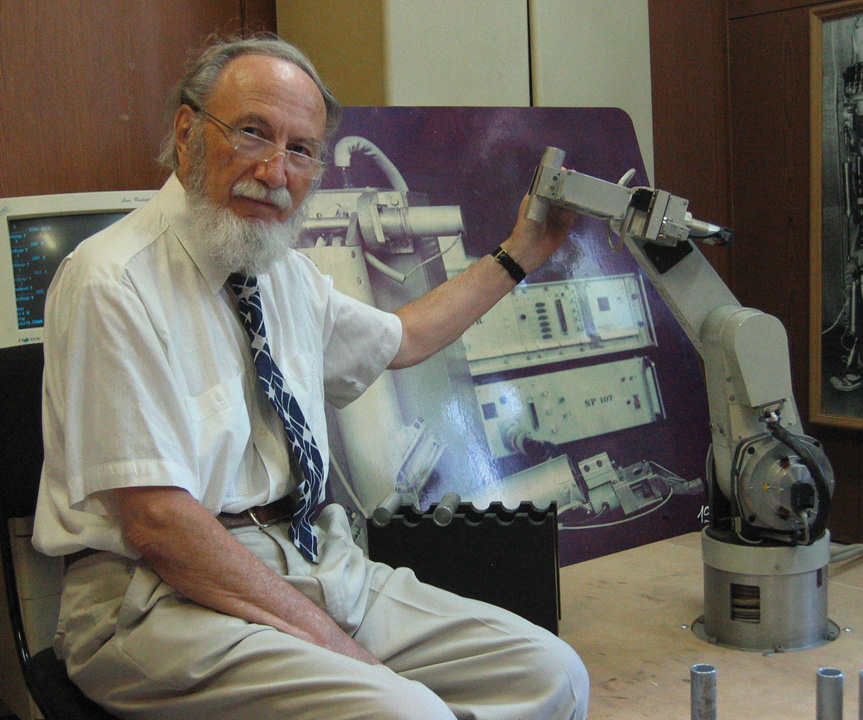
- Born: 24 December 1931; Botoš, Serbia
- Died: 11 March 2012 (aged 80); Belgrade, Serbia
- Known for: Humanoid robots
- Awards: National 7 July Award, AVNOJ Award, Joseph F. Engelberger Award
- Scientific career
- Fields: Robot dynamics
- Institutions: Mihailo Pupin Institute in Belgrade

Miomir Vukobratović (Serbian Cyrillic: Миомир Вукобратовић) (December 24, 1931 – March 11, 2012) was a Serbian mechanical engineer and pioneer in humanoid robots. His major interest laid in the development of efficient modeling and control of robot dynamics. He was born in Botoš, near Zrenjanin, Kingdom of Yugoslavia.

== Education ==
Vukobratović received the B.Sc. and Ph.D. degrees in Mechanical Engineering from the University of Belgrade in 1957 and 1964, respectively, and the D.Sc. degree from the Institute Mashinovedeniya, Soviet (now Russian) Academy of Sciences, Moscow, 1972.

1968 onwards, he was head of the Biodynamics Department, director of the Laboratory for Robotics and Flexible Automation and director of Robotics Laboratory at the Mihailo Pupin Institute in Belgrade.

== Research ==
Most of Vukobratović's research work was related with robot dynamics. He contributed to manipulators’ dynamics in adaptive and non-adaptive control for contact and non-contact tasks. He also studied dynamic modeling and control in locomotion robots. In 1970 Vukobratović proposed a theoretical model to explain and control biped locomotion. The fundamental concept of his model is called the Zero Moment Point. He died in 2012 in Belgrade.

== Awards and honors ==
- In 1976 he was awarded the 7th July Award, the highest award of Serbia, for his outstanding achievements in robotics.
- In 1979 he and his coauthor D. Stokic received the October Prize of Belgrade for their research monograph: Dynamic Control of Manipulators.
- In 1982 he was awarded the AVNOJ Award, the highest Yugoslav award, for his highest achievements in Robotics and Cybernetics.
- In 1994 he received the Saint Sava Medal of First Order, the highest award of Serbian church, for his world pioneering result in rehabilitation robotics.
- In 1994 he was elected as a member of Serbian Academy of Sciences and Arts in the Department of Technical Sciences.
- Diplomas holder of honored professor at Harbin Institute of Technology and Far Eastern Technical University at Vladivostok (Russia).
- In 1996 he was awarded the Joseph F. Engelberger award from the Robotic Industries Association in the USA, for his pioneering results in applied research and education in robotics.
- Doctor Honoris Causa of Moscow State M.V. Lomonosov University .
- Doctor Honoris Causa of University of Novi Sad (Serbia).
- Doctor Honoris Causa of Technical University at Timișoara (Romania).
