= Kenneth M. Ford =

American computer scientist

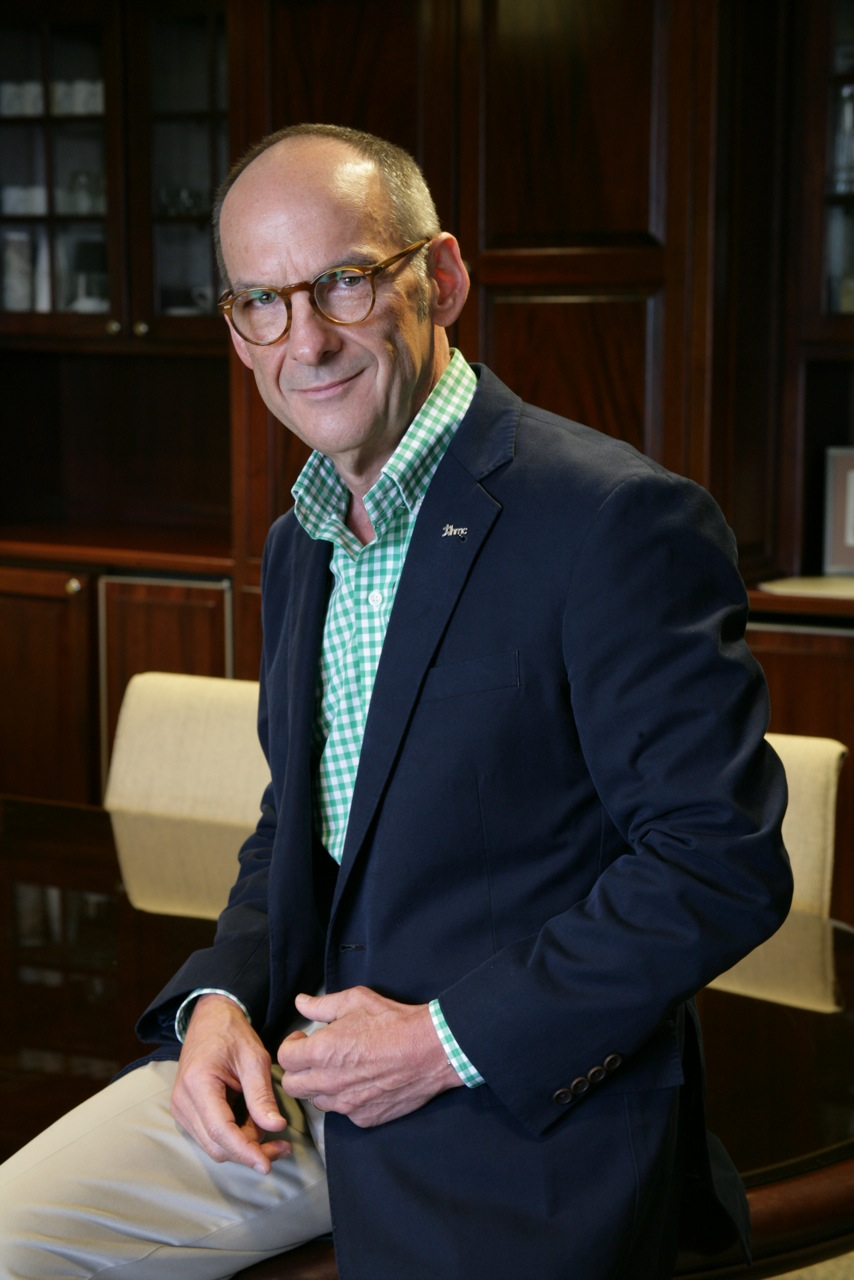
- Born: 1955 (age 70–71)
- Education: Tulane University (PhD); University of West Florida (MS); New Hampshire College (BS)
- Occupation: Computer scientist
- Known for: Artificial Intelligence, Human Performance, STEM-Talk
- Notable work: Founder of the Florida Institute for Human & Machine Cognition

Kenneth M. Ford is an American computer scientist who is the Founder & CEO Emeritus of the Florida Institute for Human and Machine Cognition (IHMC), a research center affiliated with the State University System of Florida. He resides in Pensacola, Florida, with his wife Nancy.

== Early life and education ==
Ford was born in 1955 to Gayle Kenneth Ford and Lavonne Jewell Ford. He attended East Greenwich High School and Rhode Island College. Ford served in the United States Navy from 1976 to 1983. He obtained a B.S. from New Hampshire College in 1983, his M.S. in systems science from the University of West Florida in 1984, and a Ph.D. in computer science from Tulane University in 1988. He became an assistant professor in computer science at the University of West Florida in 1988 and a full professor in 1997. In the early 1990s, he and fellow University of West Florida professor Alberto Cañas cofounded IHMC on the University of West Florida campus.

== Career ==
Ford is best known for his contributions in the areas of AI and human-centered computing, as well as the co-founding of IHMC in 1990. The Association for the Advancement of Artificial Intelligence elected Ford a fellow in 2000 for his "leadership in exploring and explaining foundational issues and in establishing large-scale AI research programs and institutions."

Ford served as IHMC's CEO from 1990-2024, except for 1997 and 1998 when he took a leave of absence to work at NASA. The agency asked Ford to establish and direct its new Center of Excellence (COE) for Information Technology at the Ames Research Center. He spent the next two years at NASA as the COE's director as well as the associate director of NASA's Ames Research Center before returning to Florida and IHMC.

President George W. Bush nominated Ford in 2002 to serve on the National Science Board. The Senate confirmed the nomination, and Ford served on the board from 2002 to 2008. He also served as a member of the United States Air Force Scientific Advisory Board from 2005 to 2009. In 2007, Ford was appointed to the NASA Advisory Council. On October 16, 2008, Ford was named as chairman – a capacity in which he served until October 2011. In February 2012, Ford was appointed to the Defense Science Board (DSB), and in 2013 he became a member of the Advanced Technology Board (ATB) which supports the Office of the Director of National Intelligence (ODNI). In 2018, Ford was named to the 15-member National Security Commission on Artificial Intelligence, a congressionally mandated commission assigned to address AI issues related to the national security and defense needs of the United States.

Since 2016, he has been the co-host of IHMC's podcast, STEM-Talk, an educational service of the institute that is described as "conversations with some of the most interesting people in the world of science and technology."

Ford is a charter Fellow of the National Academy of Inventors and since 1988 he has been a member of the Association for Computing Machinery (ACM), the National Association of Scholars and the IEEE Computer Society. He is a Behavioral and Brain Sciences (BBS) Associate and is the Editor-in-Chief of AAAI/MIT Press.

Ford holds two US patents.

In November 2024, Ford announced that he would step down as CEO of IHMC in January 2025. He was replaced by Morley Stone, who previously held the position of Chief Strategic Partnership Officer.

== Publications ==
=== Books ===
- Kenneth M. Ford (1993), "Knowledge Acquisition as Modeling", Wiley
- Robert R. Hoffman (2012-09-27), "Collected Essays on Human-Centered Computing, 2001-2011", IEEE Computer Society Press, ISBN 9780769547152
- Kenneth M. Ford, James Allen, Niranjan Suri (2010-06-22), "PIM: a novel architecture for coordinating behavior of distributed systems.(process-integrated mechanisms)", AI Magazine
- Clark Glymour, Kenneth M. Ford, Patrick Hayes (1995-08-04), "Android Epistemology", AAAI Press, ISBN 9780262519045
- Kenneth M. Ford, Clark Glymour, Patrick Hayes (2006-03-24), "Thinking about Android Epistemology", AAAI Press
- Paul J. Feltovich, Kenneth M. Ford, Robert R. Hoffman (1997-04-15), "Expertise in Context", AAAI Press, ISBN 9780262561105
- Zenon W. Pylyshyn, Kenneth M. Ford (1996), "The Robots Dilemma Revisited: The Frame Problem in Artificial Intelligence", Praeger
- Kenneth M. Ford, Patrick J. Hayes (1991), "Reasoning Agents in a Dynamic World: The Frame Problem", Jai Pr, ISBN 9781559380829

== Honors and awards ==
NASA awarded Ford its Outstanding Leadership Medal in 1999 for his leadership at NASA Ames Research Center. In 2005, Ford received the Doctor Honoris Causa from the University of Bordeaux. After becoming an AAAI fellow in 2000, Ford received the Robert S. Engelmore Memorial Award from AAAI in 2008. In August 2010, Dr. Ford was awarded NASA's Distinguished Public Service Medal – the highest civilian honor the agency confers. In 2012, Tulane University named Ford its Outstanding Alumnus in the School of Science and Engineering. In 2015, the Association for the Advancement of Artificial Intelligence named Ford the recipient of the 2015 Distinguished Service Award. Also in 2015, Dr. Ford was elected as Fellow of the American Association for the Advancement of Science (AAAS). In 2017, Ford was inducted into the Florida Inventors Hall of Fame. In 2020, Florida Trend named Ford one of its Living Legends, a list of all-time influential Florida leaders in business, medicine, academia, entertainment, politics, and sport.
