= ZMP INC. =

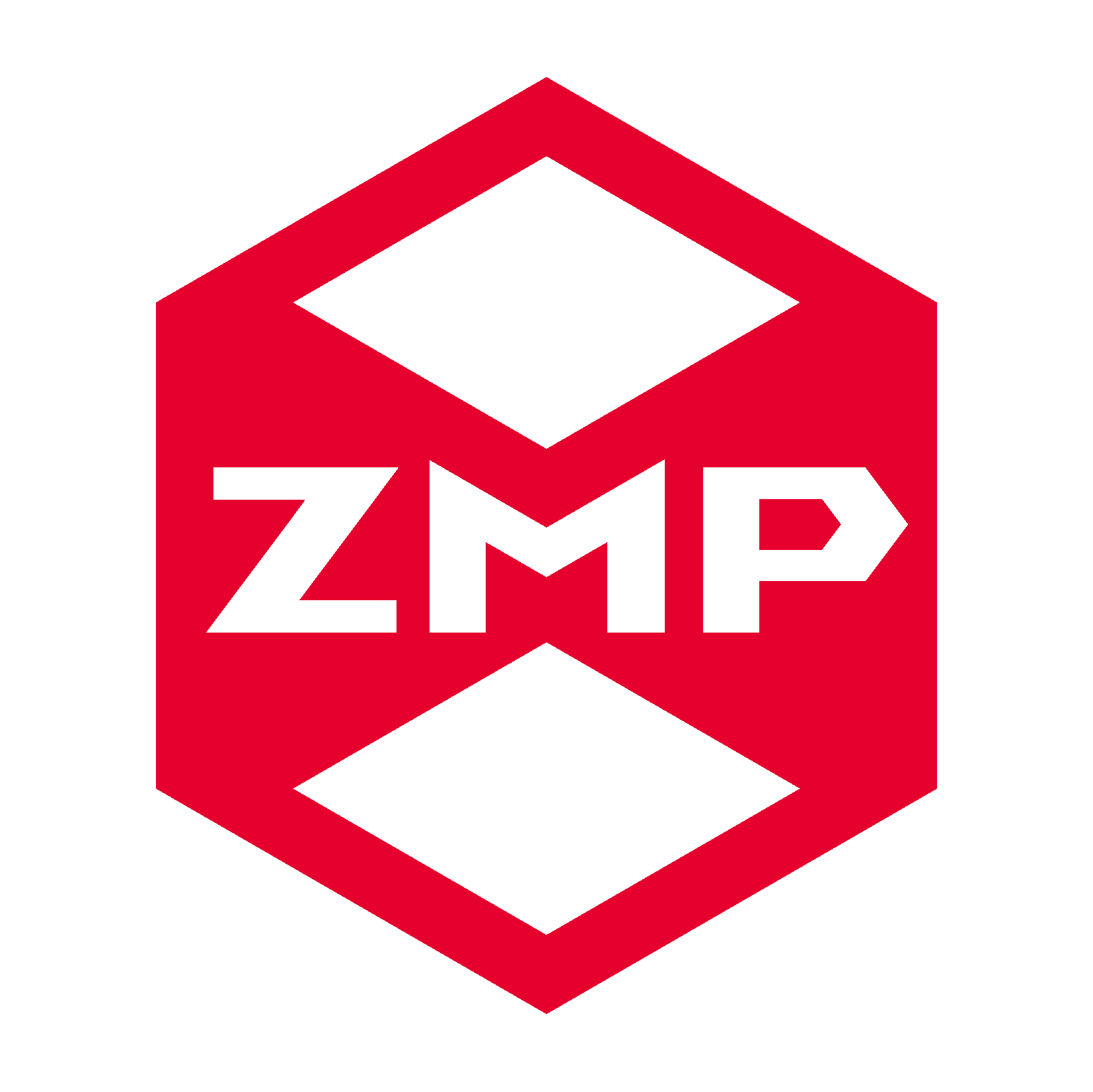
- Type: Private
- Industry: Robots
- Founded: 2001
- Founder: Hisashi Taniguchi
- Headquarters: Tokyo, Japan
- Area served: Japan, International
- Products: Domestic robots Educational Robots; Research platforms
- Parent: Sony Group Corporation
- Subsidiaries: Aerosense Inc.
- Website: ZMP INC. homepage

ZMP Inc. is a Japanese robotics company. The company was established in January 2001, based on the research results encouraged the Kitano Symbiotic System Project, under the jurisdiction of Japan's MEXT. Their first product released was the humanoid robot PINO in 2001.

The company's name comes from the Zero Moment Point, a physical quantity related to the dynamics of legged systems.

More recently, they released the humanoid robot nuvo in 2005 and the music robot miuro in 2006.

In 2009, the research platform for next generation cars RoboCar was released.

In 2008, ZMP and 3 other Japanese robot companies (Tmsuk Co Ltd, Vstone Co Ltd, and Business Design Laboratory Co Ltd) teamed up in an effort to promote the diffusion of robotic technologies in everyday life. This effort was called the 'Association for Market Creation of the Future Generation Robots'.

In July 2015, Sony teamed up with ZMP Inc. to form a Joint venture called Aerosense, to create commercial drones for the survey and inspection of difficult to access (e.g. remote) areas. The following month, Aerosense released videos of two prototypes, the AS-DTO1-E VTOL, and the AS-MCO1-P quadcopter.

== Sony Electric Vehicle ==
ZMP is also working together with Sony in a different area. Google is working on Automobile technology, self-driving cars. More recently, Apple has worked on electric vehicles (iCar/Project Titan). Sony, following suit in the developing self-driving automotive industry, has invested $842,000 in ZMP.

== PATORO disinfection robot ==
To help building managers deal with the COVID-19 pandemic, ZMP is leasing PATORO, an "autonomous security and disinfection robot", for spraying disinfectant over surfaces, such as the hallways of large structures; PATORO also has building security functions.
