= Botoš =

Botoš Ботош
- Village (Selo)
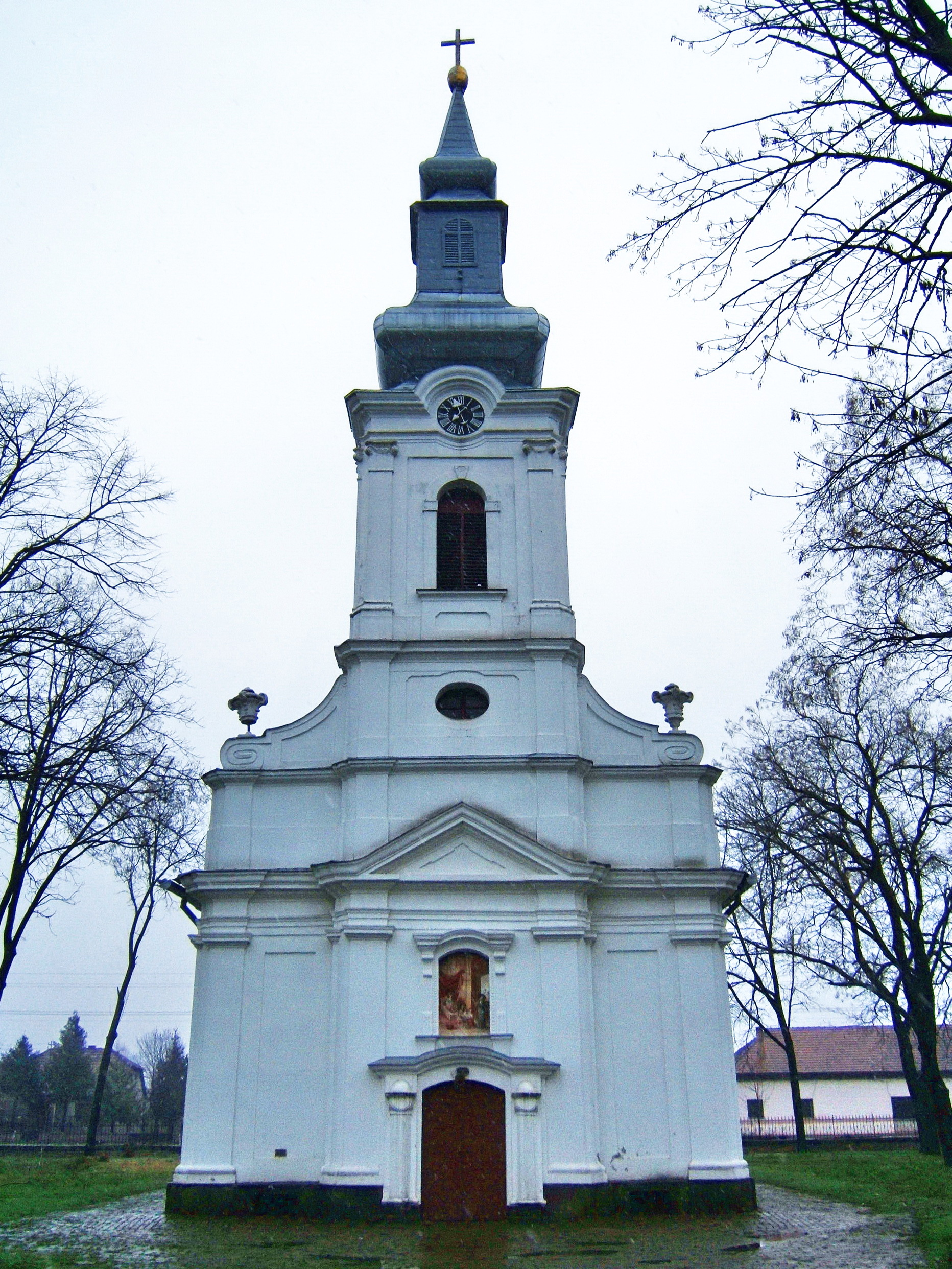
- The Orthodox Church

- Location within Serbia Botoš (Serbia) Botoš (Europe)
- Coordinates: 45°18′18″N 20°38′06″E
- Country: Serbia
- Province: Vojvodina
- District: Central Banat
- Municipalities: Zrenjanin
- Elevation: 68 m (223 ft)

Population (2022)
  - Total: 1,494
- Time zone: UTC+1 (CET)
  - Summer (DST): UTC+2 (CEST)
- Postal code: 23243
- Area code: +381(0)23
- Car plates: ZR

Botoš (Serbian Cyrillic: Ботош; Hungarian: Botos) is a village located in the Zrenjanin municipality, in the Central Banat District of Serbia. It is situated in the Autonomous Province of Vojvodina. The village has a Serb ethnic majority (89.43%) and its population numbering 2,148 people (2002 census).

== Name ==
In Serbian, the village is known as Botoš or Ботош, in Hungarian as Bótos, and in German as Botosch.

== Historical population ==
- 1961: 3,305
- 1971: 2,820
- 1981: 2,569
- 1991: 2,436
- 2002: 2,148
- 2011: 1,860
- 2022: 1,494

== Notable inhabitants ==
- Miomir Vukobratović, pioneer of engineering in field of humanoid robots was born in Botoš.

== See also ==
- List of places in Serbia
- List of cities, towns and villages in Vojvodina
