= PINO =

The Open PINO Platform (or just PINO) is an open humanoid robot platform, with its mechanical and software design covered by the GNU Free Documentation License and GNU General Public License respectively.

The external housing design of the PINO is a proprietary registered design, and the term PINO is trademarked.

The intention of PINO's designers appears to be to create a Linux-like open platform for robotics.

A commercial version of PINO is being sold by ZMP INC. a Tokyo-based robotics company. The latest version of the platform is Version 3 (released in August 2006).
