= NimbRo =

Competitive robotics team

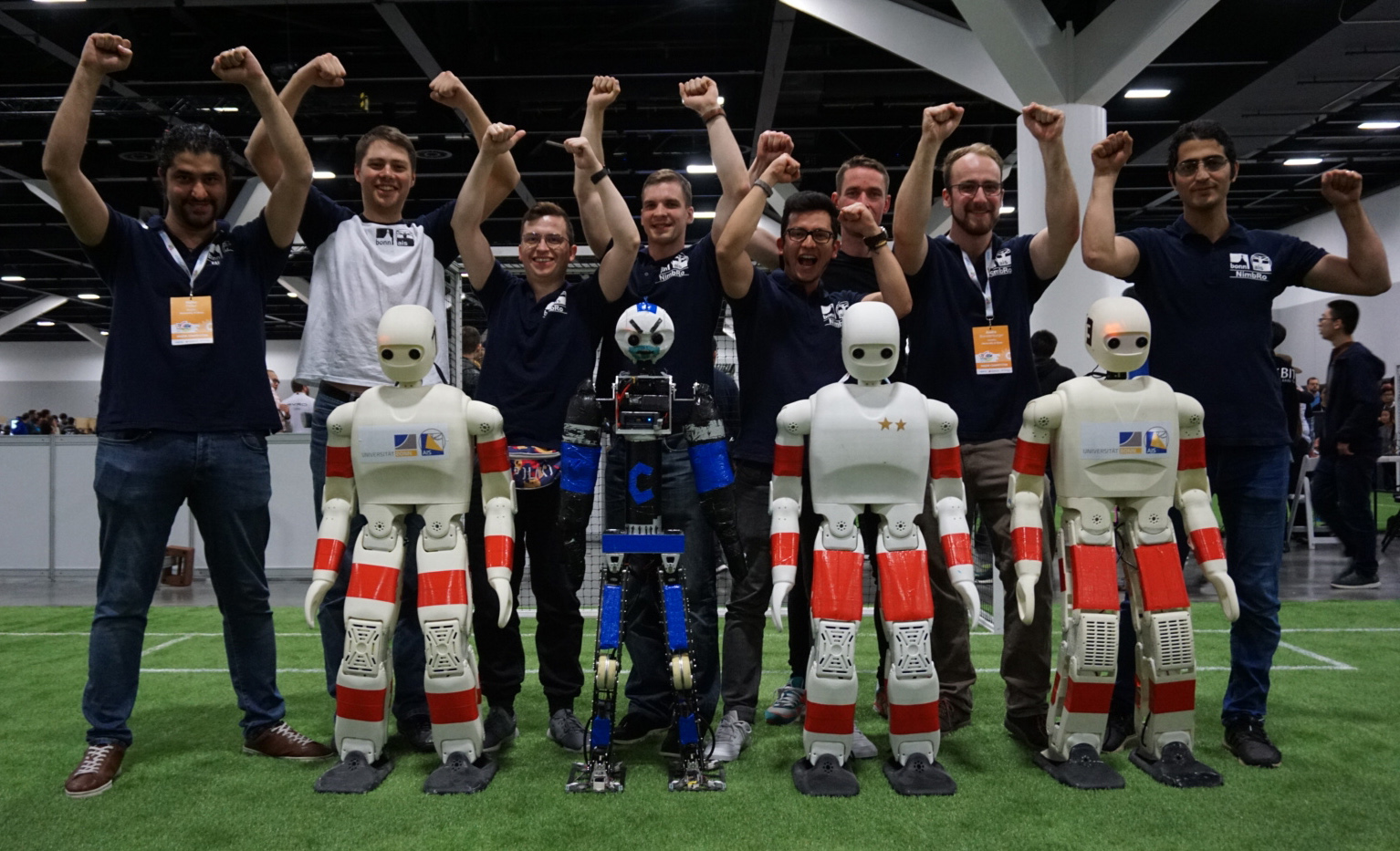
NimbRo Soccer Team winning RoboCup 2019 Humanoid AdultSize competitions in Sydney

NimbRo is the robot competition team of the Autonomous Intelligent Systems group of University of Bonn, Germany. It was founded in 2004 at the University of Freiburg, Germany.

== Research ==
The project NimbRo – Learning Humanoid Robots – was initially funded by the German Research Foundation (DFG). Focus was on the development of humanoid robots. Both hardware and software were developed for perception, planning, and learning.

The robot systems have been integrated and tested in challenging domains. Initially, humanoid soccer robots and communication robots for intuitive multimodal interactions with humans were developed. In recent years, robots have also been developed for domestic service, search and rescue, micro aerial vehicles, and bin picking. NimbRo has developed autonomous micro aerial vehicles designed for tasks such as the inspection of industrial chimneys.

NimbRo has competed in numerous robot soccer competitions. One of the challenges of designing a robot for humanoid soccer is the generation of dynamic movements while maintaining balance, an area of robot development important in practical applications. Hardware and software developed by NimbRo has been used by multiple other robotics competition teams.

NimbRo competed in the 2016 Amazon Picking Challenge, and the 2017 Amazon Robotics Challenge. Bin picking robots need to detect objects in complex scenes, estimate their pose, grasp them, and place the objects at a target location.

The mobile manipulation robot Momaro was designed for the DARPA Robotics Challenge and inspired the Centauro robot, which was developed the European research Project CENTAURO.

The 2018 NimbRo-OP2X robot played in the RoboCup Humanoid AdultSize class. It is 135 tall and has a weight of 18 kg. Its hard- and software are open source. Its structural parts are 3D-printed from polymers.

For the ANA Avatar XPRIZE competition, NimbRo developed an immersive telepresence system consisting of an anthropomorphic mobile robot and an operation station. In 2022, NimbRo won the Finals and received the Grand Prize of 5 Million US$.

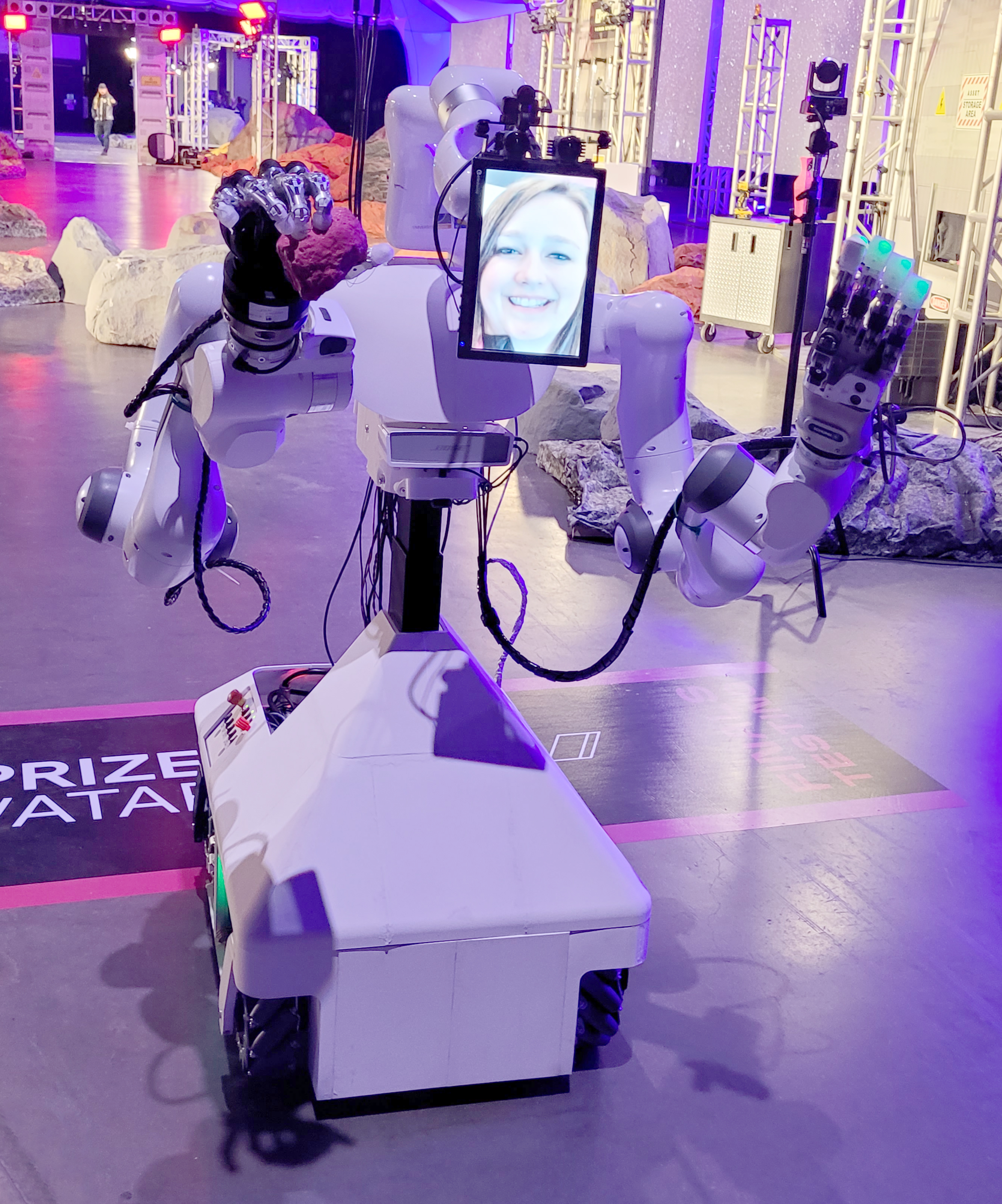
NimbRo Avatar Telepresence Robot winning ANA Avatar XPRIZE Finals

== Competitions and challenges ==
NimbRo participated at the following robot competitions and challenges:

- RoboCup, robot soccer – in the Humanoid League size classes AdultSize, TeenSize, and KidSize
- ANA Avatar XPRIZE Competition
- Mohamed Bin Zayed International Robotics Challenge (MBZIRC)
- DARPA Robotics Challenge (DRC), search and rescue robots
- RoboCup@Home, domestic service robots
- Amazon Picking/Robotics Challenge, bin picking robots
- European Robotics Challenges (EuRoC), robots for industrial use cases
- DLR SpaceBot Cup, space exploration robots

The team won world championship titles in 2009–2013, including first place in 2011 and 2012, and 2016-2019 in the RoboCup Humanoid League robot soccer.

In MBZIRC 2017, NimbRo won the Grand Challenge ($1 million prize) and one of the individual challenges. The focus of this competition was mobile manipulation and autonomous micro aerial vehicles.
