= URBI =

Urbi
- Original author: Jean-Christophe Baillie
- Developers: Gostai, Aldebaran Robotics
- Release: 2003; 23 years ago
- Stable release: 2.7.4 / November 17, 2011; 14 years ago
- Written in: urbiscript, C++
- Operating system: Windows NT, macOS, Linux
- Type: Robotics suite, operating system, library
- License: BSD
- Repository: github.com/urbiforge/urbi

Urbi is an open-source cross-platform software computing platform written in C++ used to develop applications for robotics and complex systems. Urbi is based on the UObject distributed C++ component architecture. It also includes the urbiscript orchestration language which is a parallel and event-driven script language. UObject components can be plugged into urbiscript and appear as native objects that can be scripted to specify their interactions and data exchanges. UObjects can be linked to the urbiscript interpreter, or executed as autonomous processes in "remote" mode.

== The urbiscript language ==
The urbiscript language was created in 2003 by Jean-Christophe Baillie in the Cognitive Robotics Lab of ENSTA, Paris. It has been actively and further developed in the industry through the Gostai company founded in 2006. It is now an open source project, with a BSD license, available on GitHub.

The urbiscript language can be best described as an orchestration script language: like Lua in video games, urbiscript can be used to glue together C++ components into a functional behavior, the CPU-intensive algorithmic part being left to C++ and the behavior scripting part being left to the script language which is more flexible, easy to maintain and allows dynamic interaction during program execution. As an orchestration language, urbiscript also brings some useful abstractions to a program by having parallelism and event-based programming as part of the language semantics. The scripting of parallel behaviors and reactions to events are core requirements of most robotic and complex AI applications, therefore urbiscript (and the whole Urbi platform) is well suited to such applications.

=== Language attributes ===
- Parallelism and event-based programming
- Prototype-based programming
- C++ like syntax
- Java and C++ based component architecture (UObject) with possibility to link objects or run them remotely
- Client–server model architecture
- Cross platform: Linux, Macintosh, Windows, others.
- Embeddable, Urbi can run on various processors: x86, ARM, MIPS, powerPC, etc.
- Job control via "tags"

== Functions ==
- Parallel programming and event-driven programming
- Programming prototypes
- Syntax similar to C++
- Architecture components: C++, Java (UObject) with the ability to link object or execute remotely
- Client–server model
- Interfaces with customers Java and MATLAB (Urbi SDK)
- Multiple platforms: Linux, macOS, Windows NT, and embedded environments (x86, ARM, MIPS, powerPC)
- Marking orders for their control so asynchronous
- Integration of Robot Operating System (ROS) directly accessible from urbiscript (version 2.1)

=== Examples ===
The example below shows how to write a ball tracking action/perception loop in urbiscript: headYaw/headPitch are two motor objects, and ball is the ball detection object (x and y range from -1/2 to 1/2):

  whenever (ball.visible)
  {
      headYaw.val   += camera.xfov * ball.x
    &
      headPitch.val += camera.yfov * ball.y
  };

whenever is used to trigger a piece of code in loops as long as the associated condition is true. The & sign is used to specify that both commands should start at the same time, thus running in parallel.

Other notable event-driven constructs include at, which triggers the associated code once when the event is triggered:

  at (speech.hear?("hello"))
  {
    voice.say("How are you?") &
    robot.standup();
  }

Every command or group of commands is taggable, which provides a way to stop it later if needed:

  myTag:
    while (true)
      echo("This is a never ending loop"),
  at (button.pressed)
    myTag.stop;

Note in the example above the comma at the end of the command. It will put the preceding command in the background, allowing the flow execution to carry on, in particular the next 'at' command to be executed.

== UObject component architecture ==
The UObject component architecture allows developers to interface any Java/C++ object within Urbi, making selected methods and attributes visible in urbiscript, while in fact being compiled code. Special notifiers can be set on any of the object's attributes to notify the C++ side of any change on these attributes on the urbiscript/Urbi side.

UObject uses C++ templates to transparently map any requested method to an interface machinery that takes care of the type checking.

A UObject can be used in plugged mode if it is directly linked to Urbi at compile time or with dynamic loading. In that case, the C++ object shares the Urbi memory directly, resulting in efficient integration. This is typically used for time critical components like motor or sensor drivers. The same UObject can also be used without modifications as a remote component. In that case, it will become an autonomous program to be executed with the IP address of the Urbi server as a parameter. In both cases, the object will transparently appear in urbiscript as a native urbiscript object.

== Ecosystem ==
=== Robotics simulators compatible with Urbi ===
- Webots is the official robot simulator compatible with Urbi.
- Player/Stage integration has been reported, although it is not currently released.

=== Urbi-fied robots ===
Released:

- Gostai Open Jazz
- Segway PT
- Aibo ERS-7/ERS-2xx (Urbi 1.x only, Urbi 2.3 is available as alpha)
- iRobot Create
- Lego Mindstorms NXT
- HRP-2 (restricted release to members of JRL)
- Nao
- Robotis Bioloid
- Mobile Robots Pioneer

Announced:

- Surveyor
- Khepera III
- e-puck

== See also ==
- List of robotics software
- Robotics suite
- Player Project - open-source robot interface in research and post-secondary education
- Robot Operating System (ROS)
