= Atlas (robot) =

Bipedal humanoid robot

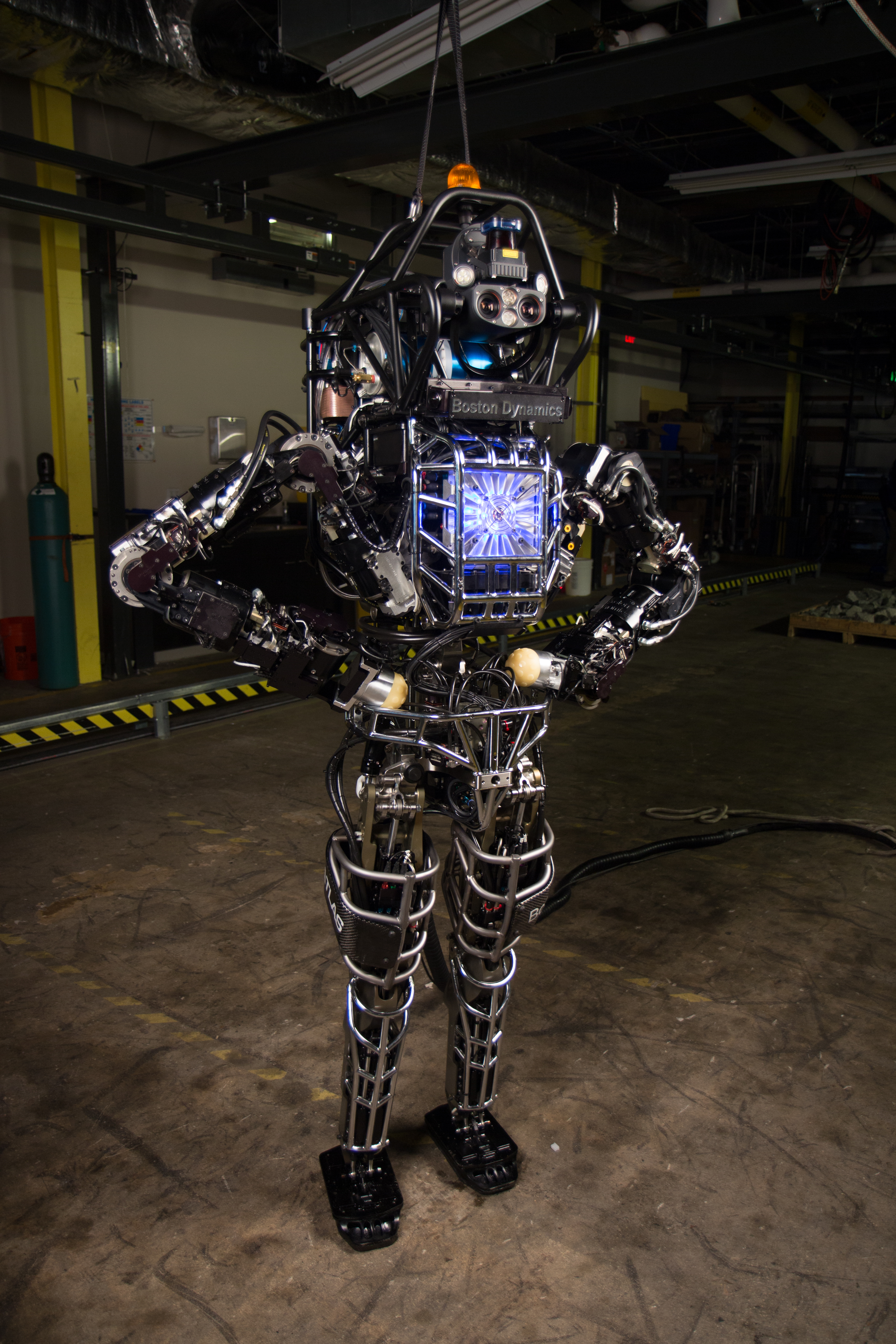
- Atlas standing
- Manufacturer: Boston Dynamics
- Year of creation: Hydraulic model: 2013; 13 years ago Electric model: 2024; 2 years ago
- Type: Humanoid robot
- Purpose: Replacement of human labor
- Derived from: PETMAN
- Website: bostondynamics.com

Atlas is the name used for multiple humanoid robot models produced by American robotics company Boston Dynamics.

The first Atlas robot was a hydraulic robot primarily developed by Boston Dynamics with funding and oversight from the U.S. Defense Advanced Research Projects Agency (DARPA). The robot was initially designed for a variety of search and rescue tasks, and was unveiled to the public in 2013.

In 2024, the hydraulic Atlas (HD Atlas) was retired from service, and a new fully electric version was announced.

== First iteration: Hydraulic model (2013–2024) ==
=== Design ===
The design and production of Atlas were overseen by DARPA, an agency of the United States Department of Defense, in cooperation with Boston Dynamics. One of the robot's hands was developed by Sandia National Laboratories, while the other was developed by iRobot. In 2013, DARPA program manager Gill Pratt compared the prototype version of Atlas to a small child, saying that "a 1-year-old child can barely walk, a 1-year-old child falls down a lot ... this is where we are right now".

Atlas is based on Boston Dynamics' earlier PETMAN humanoid robot, and it is illuminated with blue LEDs. Atlas is equipped with two vision systems – a laser rangefinder and stereo cameras, both controlled by an off-board computer – and has hands with fine motor skill capabilities. Its limbs possess a total of 28 degrees of freedom. Atlas can navigate rough terrain and climb independently using its arms and legs, although the 2013 prototype version was tethered to an outside power supply.

The new fully electric Atlas, revealed in 2024 following the previous model's retirement, is stronger and possesses a wider range of movement in comparison to its predecessor. It can also move beyond the human range of motion. The new Atlas is based on the previous Atlas' progress, building on its history of previous innovation. The new Atlas' design is more humanoid and upright, and also has a head illuminated by a ring light on its face. The new Atlas will also have different "gripper variations" to handle objects.

=== Development ===
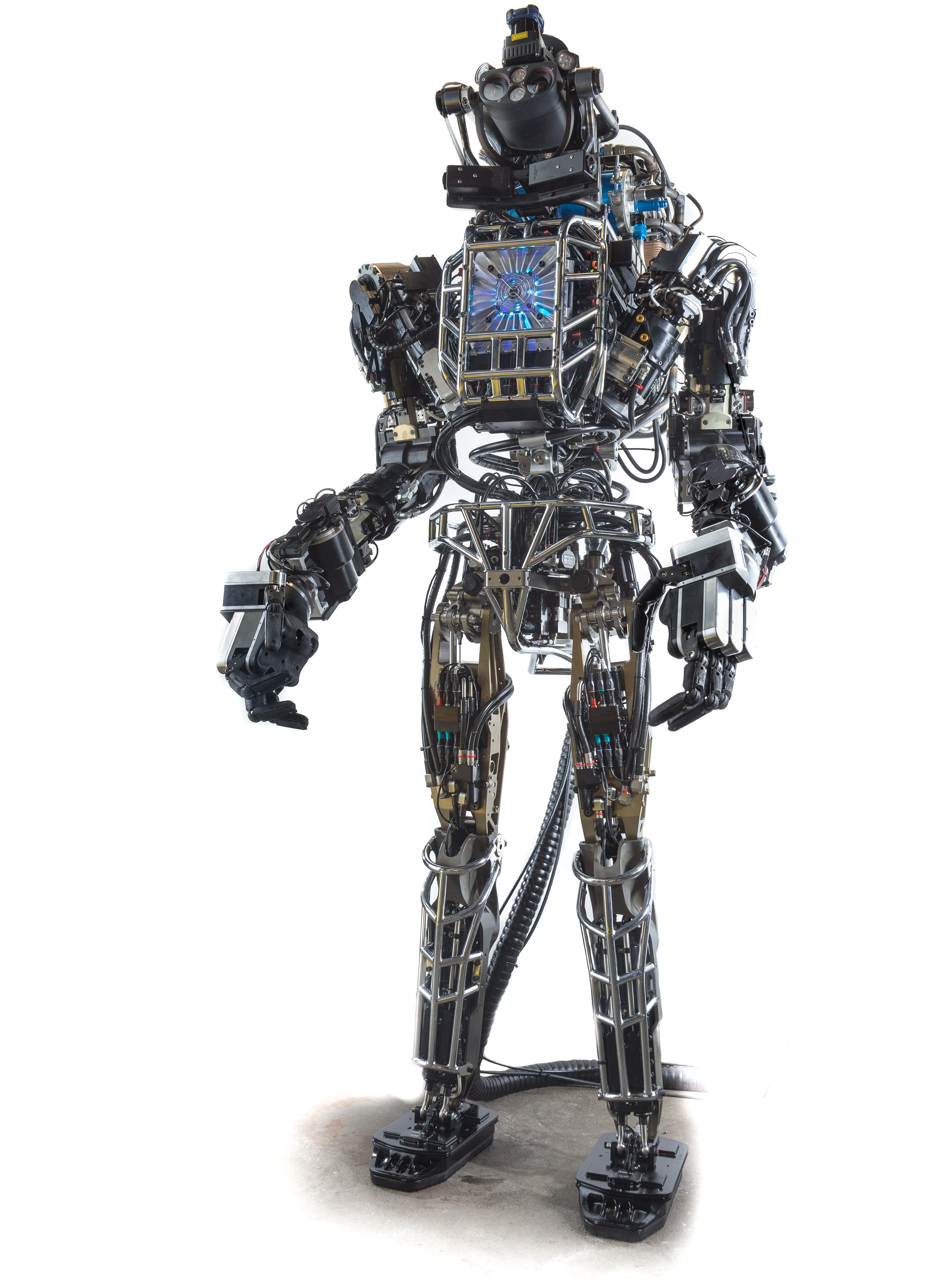
Atlas, front view in 2013

In October 2013 Boston Dynamics uploaded a video showing Atlas could withstand being hit by projectiles and balance on one leg.

In 2014, Atlas robots programmed by six different teams competed in the DARPA Robotics Challenge to test the robot's ability to perform various tasks, including getting in and out of a vehicle and driving it, opening a door, and using a power tool. A variety of other robots also competed. The contest was inspired by the 2011 Fukushima Daiichi nuclear disaster, and carries a USD 2 million prize for the winning team.

In the 2015 DARPA robotics finals Atlas from IHMC Robotics (named Running Man) came second behind the Korean team Kaist and their robot DRC-Hubo by a margin of six minutes, completing the entire course in a time of 50:26.

On February 23, 2016, Boston Dynamics released a video of a new version Atlas robot on YouTube. The new version of Atlas is designed to operate both outdoors and inside buildings. It is specialized for mobile manipulation and is very adept at walking over a wide range of terrain, including snow, and can do back flips and cartwheels. It is electrically powered and hydraulically actuated. It uses sensors in its body and legs to balance, and it uses LIDAR and stereo sensors in its head to avoid obstacles, assess the terrain, help with navigation, and manipulate objects, even when the objects are being moved. This version of Atlas is 150 cm (4 ft 11 in) tall and weighs 80 kg (180 lb).

On November 16, 2017, Boston Dynamics released an update video of the Atlas robot to YouTube. In this video Atlas was shown jumping on boxes, turning 180 degrees while jumping and performing a backflip.

On May 10, 2018, Boston Dynamics released an update video of the Atlas robot to YouTube. In this video, Atlas was shown running across the grass on uneven terrain as well as jumping over a log lying on the grass.

On October 12, Boston Dynamics released an update video of the Atlas robot to YouTube. In this video, Atlas was shown running around while jumping over boxes.

On September 24, 2019, Boston Dynamics released another update video of the Atlas robot to YouTube. In this video, Atlas was shown performing something akin to a floor routine in gymnastics. The robot demonstrates the ability to perform a handstand, somersaults, and rotations all in fluid succession. Boston Dynamics claims the robot was trained using "new techniques that streamline the development process".

On December 29, 2020, Boston Dynamics released a music video featuring two Atlas robots, a Spot robot, and a Handle robot performing a dance routine to the song "Do You Love Me".

On August 17, 2021, Boston Dynamics released a video of two Atlas robots running a parkour course with jumps, balance beams, and vaults. In another video released the same day, it is mentioned that Atlas is 5 feet tall (1.5m) and weighs 190 pounds (85 kg). Atlas is battery-powered and hydraulically actuated with 20 degrees of freedom. It has RGB cameras and depth sensors which provide input to its control system. All the computation required for control perception and estimation happen in three onboard computers.

On April 16, 2024, Boston Dynamics announced the retirement of Atlas on their YouTube channel. A new, fully electric version of Atlas was subsequently announced on April 17, 2024 through a YouTube video, featuring a comprehensive remodel and expanded range of motion.

=== Applications ===
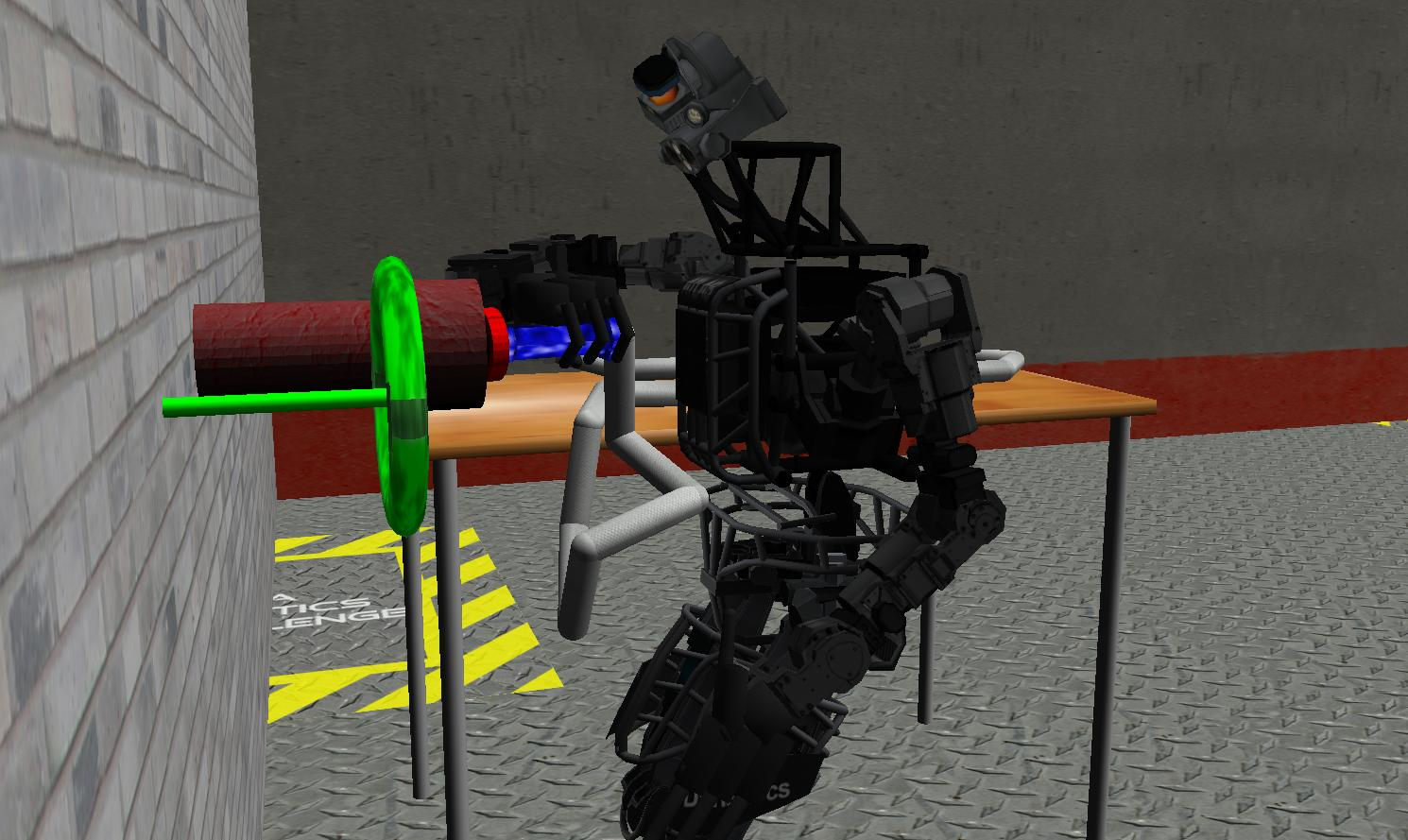
An Atlas robot connects a hose to a pipe in a Gazebo computer simulation.

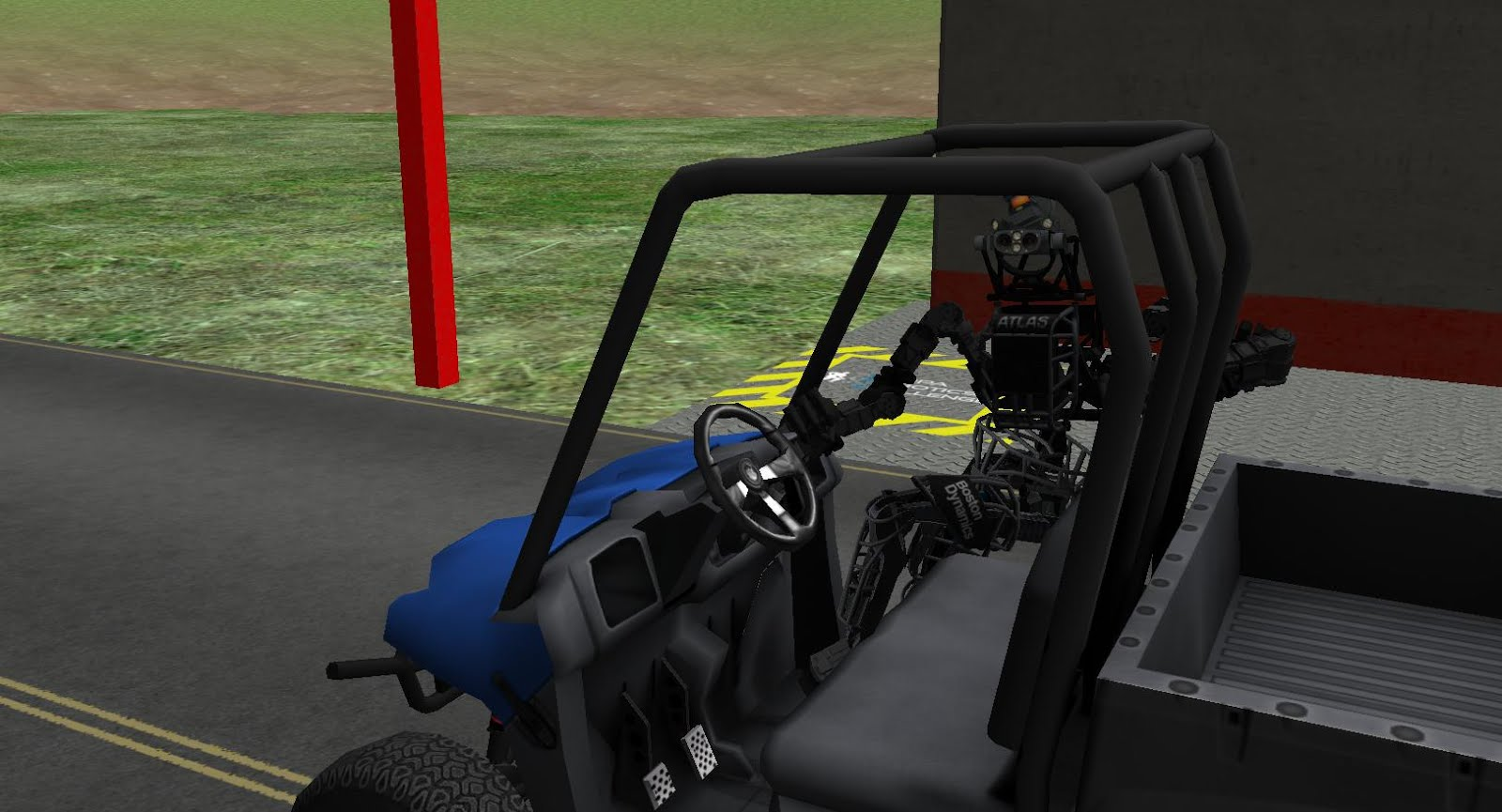
Simulated image of Atlas robot climbing into a vehicle

Atlas is intended to aid emergency services in search and rescue operations, performing tasks such as shutting off valves, opening doors and operating powered equipment in environments where humans could not survive. The Department of Defense stated in 2013 that it had no interest in using the robot for offensive or defensive warfare.

In the 2015 DARPA competition of robotics, Atlas was able to complete all eight tasks as follows:

1. Drive a utility vehicle at the site.
2. Travel dismounted across rubble.
3. Remove debris blocking an entryway.
4. Open a door and enter a building.
5. Climb an industrial ladder and traverse an industrial walkway.
6. Use a tool to break through a concrete panel.
7. Locate and close a valve near a leaking pipe.
8. Connect a fire hose to a standpipe and turn on a valve.

=== Reactions ===
Atlas was unveiled to the public on July 11, 2013. The New York Times said that its debut was "a striking example of how computers are beginning to grow legs and move around in the physical world", describing the robot as "a giant – though shaky – step toward the long-anticipated age of humanoid robots". Gary Bradski, a specialist in artificial intelligence, declared that "a new species, Robo sapiens, are emerging".

== Second iteration: Electric model (2024–present) ==
The reveal of the second iteration of Atlas

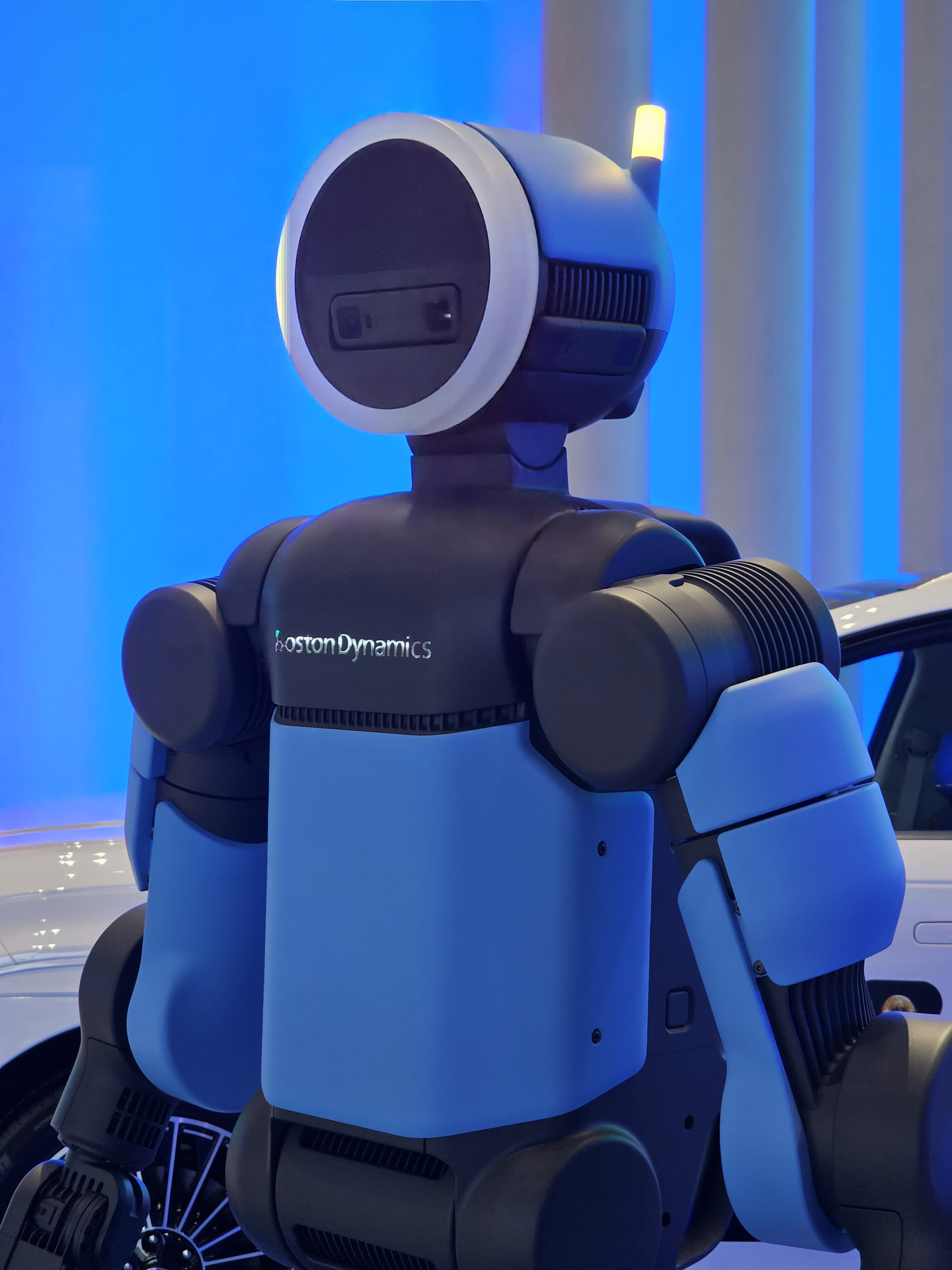
Production model

The new fully electric Atlas, revealed in 2024 following the previous model's retirement, is designed to be a commercial solution for industry environments and the like, similar to Spot and Stretch. The transition to the electric platform in 2024 was enabled by the adoption of custom high-power actuators utilizing technologies such as planetary roller screws and high-density neodymium magnets. This allowed the robot to match the force density of the previous hydraulic system while eliminating fluid maintenance and reducing noise. It has even more dynamic range of movement than its predecessor, with the reveal video released on April 17 featuring Atlas getting up from a lying position in an unnatural manner. Its reveal drew many fearful reactions, with The Verge describing it as "unnerving"; The Atlantic described such "unnerving viral videos" as a marketing strategy for Boston Dynamics.

As of January 2026, a product version of Atlas designed for automobile assembly is in production, and is scheduled to be deployed at Hyundai's HMGMA plant in 2028. This version of Atlas was first publicly displayed at CES 2026, where it took part in a live demonstration while remotely controlled, though the product version is intended to function fully autonomously. At CES 2026, Atlas demonstrated its capabilities in sequencing car parts and arranging vehicle components. CNET named Atlas the "Best Robot" of CES 2026. Google's Gemini Robotics AI model is expected to be paired with Atlas. Boston Dynamics CEO Robert Playter said that the goal of AI integration was for Atlas robots to eventually have the capability to be "contextually aware of their environment and able to use their hands to manipulate any object".

In June, Boston Dynamics tried to teach the robot how to play soccer.

On November 9, an Atlas with wheeled feet was demonstrated.

== See also ==
- Android (robot)
- ASIMO
- BigDog, a military robot built by Boston Dynamics
- Hybrid Assistive Limb, a powered exoskeleton for medical and emergency applications
- HRP-4C
- HUBO
- iCub
- InMoov
- Nao
- REEM
- Robonaut
