= Nao (robot) =

Small humanoid robot developed by the French company Aldebaran

NAO EVOLUTION V5
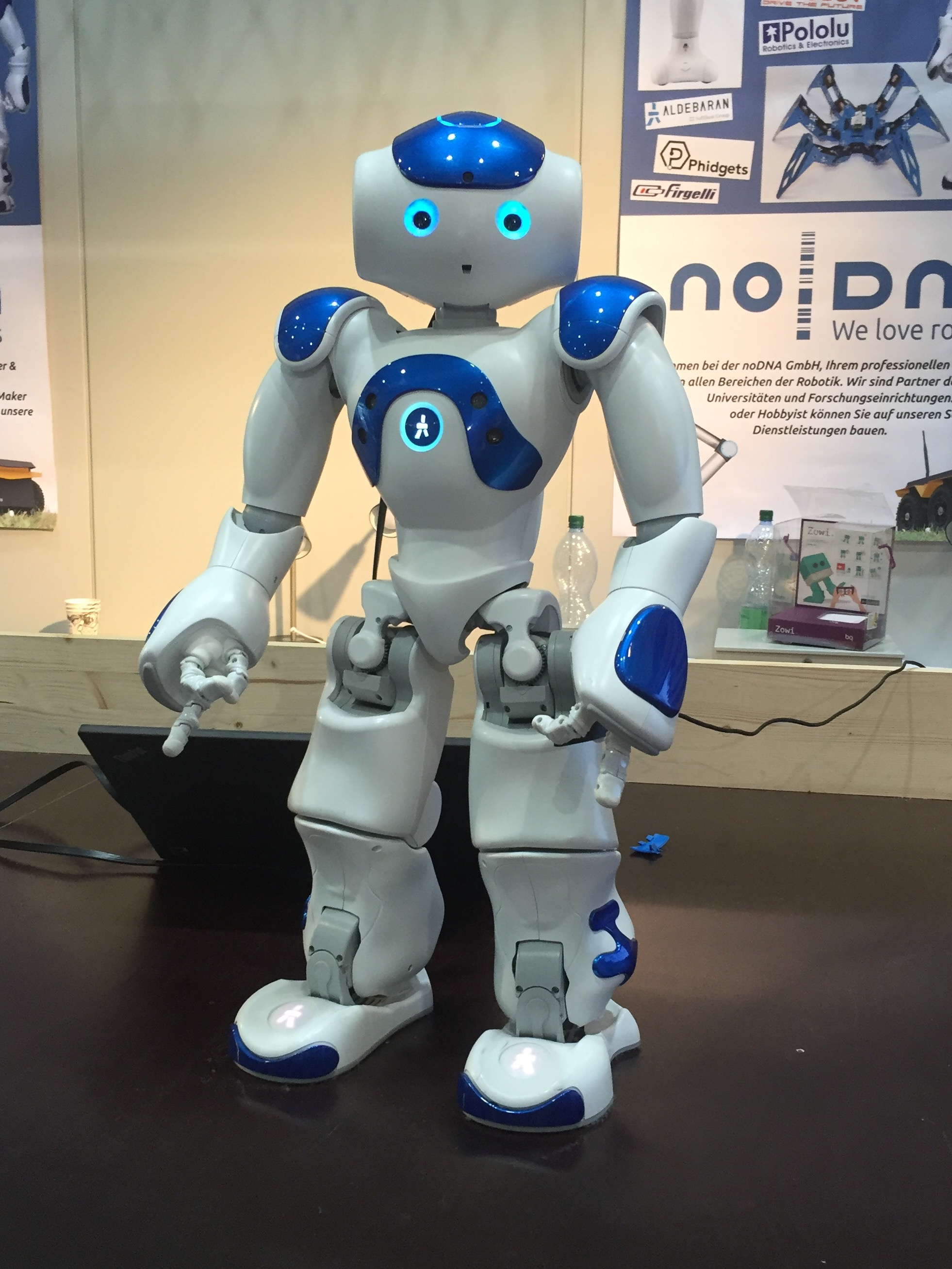
- Robocup, 2016
- Manufacturer: Aldebaran (previously Aldebaran Robotics and Softbank Robotics)
- Country: France
- Year of creation: 2008 (first public version)
- Type: Humanoid robot
- Purpose: Research, education and entertainment
- Website: https://www.maxtronics.com/en/nao6

A Nao robot at the Fêtons Linux in Geneva, Switzerland, in October 2011 (video)

Nao robots in a Webots RoboCup soccer simulation

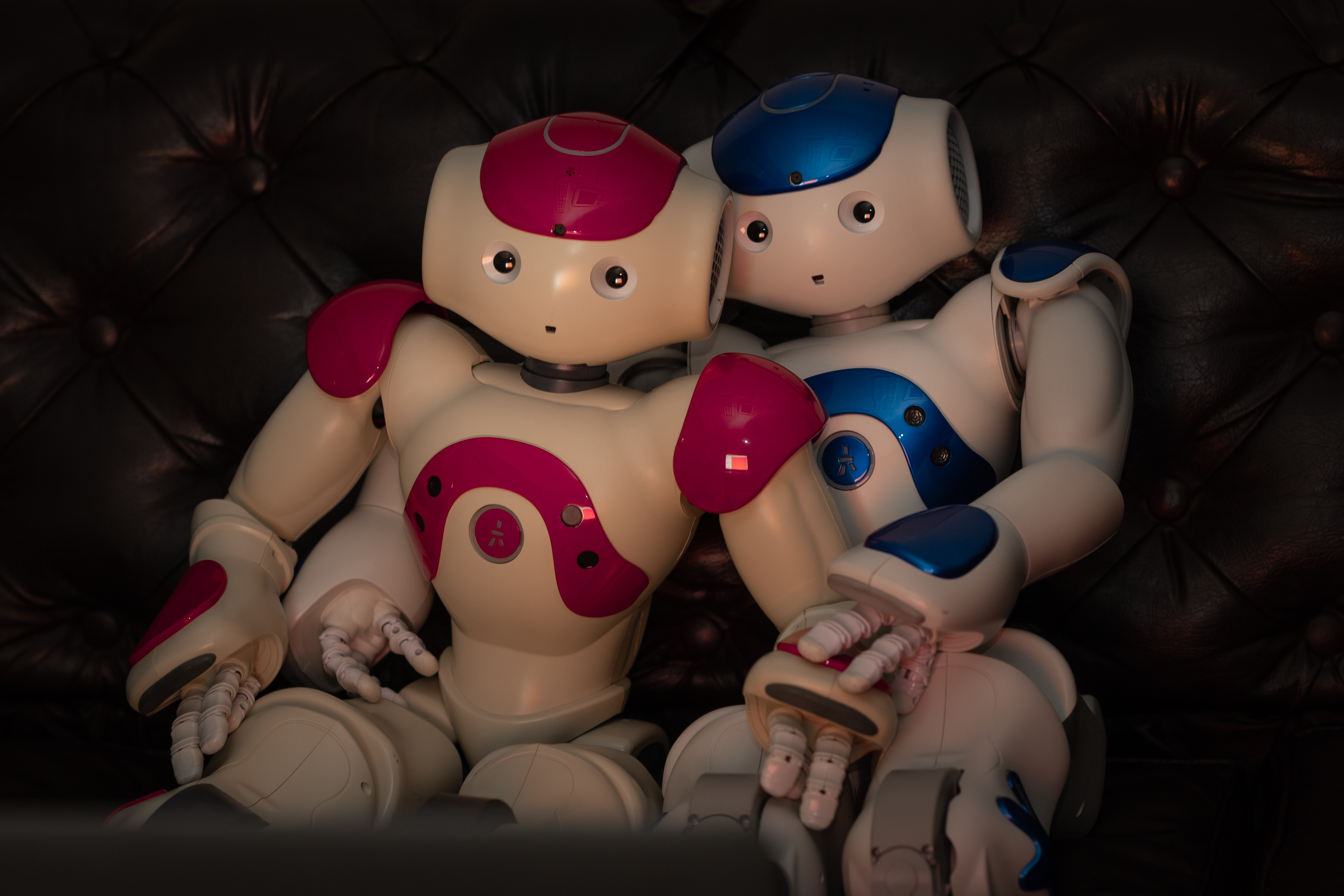
Two NAO robots simulating a loving couple watching a movie

NAO (pronounced now) is an autonomous, programmable humanoid robot developed by Aldebaran (formerly known as Aldebaran Robotics and also SoftBank Robotics Europe while owned by SoftBank), a now defunct French robotics company from Paris. The robot's development began with the launch of Project Nao in 2004. On 15 August 2007, Nao replaced Sony's robot dog Aibo as the robot used in the RoboCup Standard Platform League (SPL), an international robot soccer competition. The Nao was used in RoboCup 2008 and 2009, and the NaoV3R was chosen as the platform for the SPL at RoboCup 2010.

Several versions of the robot have been released since 2008. The Nao Academics Edition was developed for universities and laboratories for research and education purposes. It was released to institutions in 2008, and was made publicly available by 2011. Various upgrades to the Nao platform have since been released, including the 2011 Nao Next Gen, the 2014 Nao Evolution and the 2018 Nao^{6}.

NAO is able to speak 21 languages. NAO robots have also been used for research and healthcare purposes worldwide in numerous autism centers, pediatric and geriatric hospitals and senior living facilities.

As of 2025, over 20 000 Nao units are in use in more than 70 countries.

== Development history ==
Aldebaran Robotics was established in 2005 by Bruno Maisonnier, who had previously begun developing the robot under "Project Nao" in 2004. Six prototypes of Nao were designed between 2005 and 2007. In March 2008, the first production version of the robot, the Nao RoboCup Edition, was released to the contestants of that year's RoboCup. The Nao Academics Edition was released to universities, educational institutions and research laboratories in late 2008.

In the summer of 2010, Nao made global headlines with a synchronized dance routine at the Shanghai Expo in China. In October 2010, the University of Tokyo purchased 30 Nao robots for their Nakamura Lab, with hopes of developing the robots into active laboratory assistants. In December 2010, a Nao robot was demonstrated doing a stand-up comedy routine, and a new version of the robot was released, featuring sculpted arms and improved motors. In May 2011, Aldebaran announced that it would release Nao's controlling source code to the public as open source software. In June 2011, Aldebaran raised US$13 million in a round of venture funding led by Intel Capital. In 2013, Aldebaran was acquired by Japan's SoftBank Mobile for US$100 million.

In December 2011, Aldebaran released the Nao Next Gen, featuring hardware and software enhancements such as high-density cameras, improved robustness, anti-collision systems and a faster walking speed. The Nao Evolution, featuring enhanced durability, improved multilingual speech synthesis, improved shape and facial detection and recognition using new algorithms, and improved sound source location using four directional microphones, was released in June 2014.

Aldebaran Robotics was acquired by SoftBank Group in 2015 and rebranded as SoftBank Robotics. In July 2022, the French company was sold to United Robotics Group and rebranded Aldebaran again.

In May 2025 United Robotics Group filed for bankrupcy. As a direct consequence, in June 2025, Aldebaran (formerly SoftBank Robotics Europe) entered receivership in France.

The next month, the assets of Aldebaran were bought by Maxvision Technologies, a Chinese company, which created a dedicated new branch in France, Maxtronics, to carry on development on Aldebaran's robots.

Late 2025, Maxtronics announced to continue NAO6 distribution, development and support with some former Aldebaran employees.

NAO6 is compatible with generative AI through NAO Activities to allow non-technical users to use NAO, like teachers in K12 Education or caregivers in Healthcare area.

The 7th version of NAO (NAO7) is under development at Maxtronics and will enhance all social interaction skills of NAO:

- Powerful new CPU/GPU architecture
- Embedded AI for local processing of vision, dialog content and voice recognition, eliminating dependences on cloud services.
- Modern Cameras and Microphones, providing better detection and voice interaction.
- Touch screen (smart watch screen) on the torso button
- Higher battery capacity
- New hand with finger pointing capacity
- SDK, Low-code programming tools, modern Python API

Maxtronics has not announced any release date yet.

== Academic and scientific usage ==
Since 2011, over 200 academic institutions worldwide have made use of the robot, including the University of Hertfordshire and their Bold Hearts RoboCup Team, the Indian Institute of Information Technology, Allahabad, the University of Tokyo, the Indian Institute of Technology Kanpur, Saudi Arabia's King Fahd University of Petroleum and Minerals, University of South Wales and Montana State University. In 2012, donated Nao robots were used to teach autistic children in a UK school; some of the children found the childlike, expressive robots more relatable than humans. In a broader context, Nao robots have been used by numerous British schools to introduce children to robots and the robotics industry.

By the end of 2014, over 5,000 Nao robots were in use with educational and research institutions in 70 countries. In 2015, Mitsubishi UFJ Financial Group began trialing Nao robots for customer service use in its Japanese bank branches. In July 2015, Nao robots were shown to demonstrate a basic form of self-awareness in a philosophical experiment at Rensselaer Polytechnic Institute in New York, in which three robots were set up, muting two of them; they were then told that two of them had been given a "dumbing pill", and asked to figure out which of them hadn't. After initially replying he didn't know, the non-muted robot was able to figure out he hadn't been given the dumbing pill after hearing the sound of his own voice. In September 2015, the French Institute of Health and Medical Research used Nao robots to test a system of robotic "autobiographical memory" designed to help train International Space Station crews and assist elderly patients.

Nao is available as a research robot for schools, colleges and universities to teach programming and conduct research into human-robot interactions.

In August 2018, RobotLAB released an online learning platform for schools that enhance the use of NAO for STEM, Coding and Engineering.

== Healthcare usage ==
Since its release in 2008, Nao has been tested and deployed in a number of healthcare scenarios, including usage in care homes, schools, and as an assistant tutor for autistic children.

NAO has been used and commercialized in healthcare settings under different product names, such as Zora (by Zorabots), Robics (by Inrobics), and MEDi. Although these solutions are marketed under different names, they all rely on the same underlying NAO robotic platform. The rebranding reflects the specialized software and applications developed by dedicated companies or research laboratories to adapt NAO to specific healthcare needs and clinical environments.

== Design ==
The various versions of the Nao robotics platform feature either 2, 14, 21 or 25 degrees of freedom (DoF). A specialized model with 21 DoF and no actuated hands was created for the Robocup competition. All Nao Academics versions feature an inertial measurement unit with accelerometer, gyroscope and four ultrasonic sensors that provide Nao with stability and positioning within space. The legged versions included eight force-sensing resistors and two bumpers. The 2014 Nao Evolution, featured stronger metallic joints, improved grip and an enhanced sound source location system that utilizes four directional microphones. The most recent version, Nao^{6} was introduced in June 2018.

=== Software ===
The Nao robot is controlled by a specialized Linux-based operating system, dubbed NAOqi. The OS powers the robot's multimedia system, which includes four microphones (for voice recognition and sound localization), two speakers (for multilingual text-to-speech synthesis) and two HD cameras (for computer vision, including facial and shape recognition). The robot also comes with a software suite that includes a graphical programming tool dubbed Choregraphe, a simulation software package and a software developer's kit. Nao is furthermore compatible with the Microsoft Robotics Studio, Cyberbotics Webots, and the Gostai Studio (URBI).

In August 2018, RobotLAB released Engage! K12. It is an online learning platform for schools that enhance the use of NAO for STEM, Coding and Engineering. In February 2018, Finnish company Utelias Technologies released Elias Robot, a learning application that helps to learn languages with NAO.

=== Specifications ===
Robot Version	Nao V3+ (2008)	Nao V3.2 (2009)	Nao V3.3 (2010)	Nao Next Gen (V4) (2011)	Nao Evolution (V5) (2014)	Nao Power 6 (V6) (2018)
Height	573.2 millimetres (22.57 in)		573 millimetres (22.6 in)		574 millimetres (22.6 in)	
Depth	290 millimetres (11 in)		311 millimetres (12.2 in)			
Width	273.3 millimetres (10.76 in)		275 millimetres (10.8 in)			
Weight	4.836 kilograms (10.66 lb)		4.996 kilograms (11.01 lb)	5.1825 kilograms (11.425 lb)	5.305 kilograms (11.70 lb)	5.48 kilograms (12.1 lb)
Power supply	lithium battery providing 27.6 Wh at 21.6V				lithium battery providing 48.6 Wh at 21.6V	lithium battery providing 62.5 Wh at 21.6V
Autonomy	60 minutes (active use)				90 minutes (active use)	
Degrees of freedom	25					
CPU	x86 AMD GEODE 500 MHz			Intel Atom Z530 @ 1.6 GHz		Intel Atom E3845 Quad Core @ 1.91 GHz
RAM	256 MB			1 GB		4 GB DDR3
Storage	2 GB Flash memory			2 GB Flash memory + 8 GB Micro SDHC		32 GB SSD
Built-in OS	OpenNAO 1.6 (OpenEmbedded-based)	OpenNAO 1.8 (OpenEmbedded- based)	OpenNAO 1.10 (OpenEmbedded- based)	OpenNAO 1.12 (gentoo-based)	NAOqi 2.1 (gentoo-based)	NAOqi 2.8 (Yocto-based)
Compatible OS	Windows, Mac OS, Linux					
Programming languages	C++, Python, Java, MATLAB, Urbi, C, .Net					
Simulation environment	Webots					
Cameras	2 x Camera: OV7670 VGA(640x480), 30 fps.; Type: System-on-a-chip (SoC) CMOS image sensor; Optical format 1/6 inch; Focus range: 30 cm - infinity.; 58° Diagonal Field Of View (47.8° Horizontal FOV, 36.8° Vertical FOV)			2 x Camera: MT9M114 960p(1280x960), 30fps; Type: System-on-a-chip (SoC) CMOS image sensor; Optical format: 1/6 inch; Focus range: 30 cm - infinity.; 72.6° Diagonal Field Of View (60.9° Horizontal FOV, 47.6° Vertical FOV)		2 x Camera: OV5640; Type: System-on-a-chip (SoC) CMOS image sensor; Optical format: 1/4 inch; Active Pixels (HxV): 2592x1944 (5 MP); Output Camera output: 640*480@30fps or 2560*1920@1fps; View Field of view: 67.4°DFOV (56.3°HFOV,43.7°VFOV); Focus type: Auto focus
Sensors	36 MRE (Magnetic Rotary Encoders) using Hall-effect sensor technology. 12 bit precision, ie 4096 values per turn corresponding to about 0.1° precision; 8 x FSR (force-sensing resistors).; 2 x I/R.; Wavelength = 940 nm.; Emission angle = +/- 60°.; Power =8 mW/sr; 2 x bumpers located at the tip of each foot. These are simple ON/OFF switches. There is no difference between a push on the left or right foot.; Capacitive sensor					
Sensors	2 x gyrometer 1 axis; 1 x accelerometer 3 axis				1 x gyrometer 3 axis; 1 x accelerometer 3-axis	1 x gyrometer 3-axis; 1 x accelerometer 3-axis
Sensors	Sonar: 2 emitters, 2 receivers; Frequency: 40 kHz.; Sensitivity: -86 dB.; Resolution: 10mm.; Detection range: 0.25 - 2.55 m.; Effective cone: 60°.			Sonar: 2 emitters, 2 receivers.; Frequency: 40 kHz.; Sensitivity: -86 dB.; Resolution: 10 mm.; Detection range: 0.25 - 2.55 m.; Effective cone: 60°.	Sonar: 2 emitters, 2 receivers.; Frequency: 40 kHz; Resolution: 1 cm-4 cm (depending on distance); Detection range: 0.20 m - 3 m; Effective cone: 60°	Sonar: 2 emitters, 2 receivers.; Frequency: 40 kHz; Resolution: 1 cm-4 cm (depending on distance); Detection range: 0.20 m - 3 m; Effective cone: 60°
Sensors	4 microphones: Sensitivity: -40 +/- 3 dB; Frequency range: 20 Hz-20 kHz; Signal/noise ratio: 58dBA			4 microphones: Sensitivity: -40 +/- 3 dB; Frequency range: 20 Hz-20 kHz; Signal/noise ratio: 58dBA	Microphones x4 on the head; Sensitivity 20mV/Pa +/-3 dB at 1KHz; Frequency range 150 Hz to 12 kHz	4 omnidirectional Microphones; Sensitivity: 250mV/Pa +/-3 dB at 1 kHz; Frequency: range 100 Hz to 10 kHz (-10 dB relative to 1 kHz)
Connectivity	Ethernet, Wi-Fi IEEE 802.11 a/b/g					Ethernet, Wi-Fi IEEE 802.11 a/b/g/n

== See also ==
- Aldebaran Robotics (French Wikipedia)
- Educational robotics

=== Related development ===
- Romeo (French Wikipedia)
- Pepper (robot)

=== Robots of comparable role, configuration, dimensions and era ===
- Atlas (robot)
- Kirobo
- ICub
- InMoov
- QRIO
- REEM
- Robotis Bioloid
