= Mindar =

Buddhist android preacher

Coordinates: 34°59′59″N 135°46′51″E

- Inventor: Hiroshi Ishiguro
- Country: Japan
- Year of creation: 2019
- Price: ¥25 million (2019)
- Type: Humanoid
- Purpose: Giving sermons
- Website: kodaiji.com/mindar

Mindar (Japanese: マインダー), also known as Android Kannon Mindar, is an android preacher at the Kōdai-ji temple in Kyoto, Japan. The humanoid robot regularly gives sermons on the Heart Sutra at the 400-year-old Zen Buddhist temple. It was created to represent and embody Kannon, (Note: Kannon is the Japanese name for the bodhisattva Avalokiteśvara, known as Guanyin in China.) a bodhisattva associated with compassion.

Mindar was designed through a collaboration between staff of Kōdai-ji and roboticists from Osaka University, including Hiroshi Ishiguro. Construction of the 1.95 m (6 ft 5 in) tall android began in 2017 at Osaka University's robotics laboratory. Development of the android cost ¥25 million (US$227,250), while the total cost of the project was ¥100 million (US$909,090). Mindar was unveiled to the public at a ceremony in March 2019. Its 25-minute pre-programmed sermon was written by monks and addresses the Buddhist concepts of emptiness and compassion.

== Background and development ==
Kōdai-ji is a Zen Buddhist temple established in 1606 in the Higashiyama ward of Kyoto. It is part of the Rinzai school.

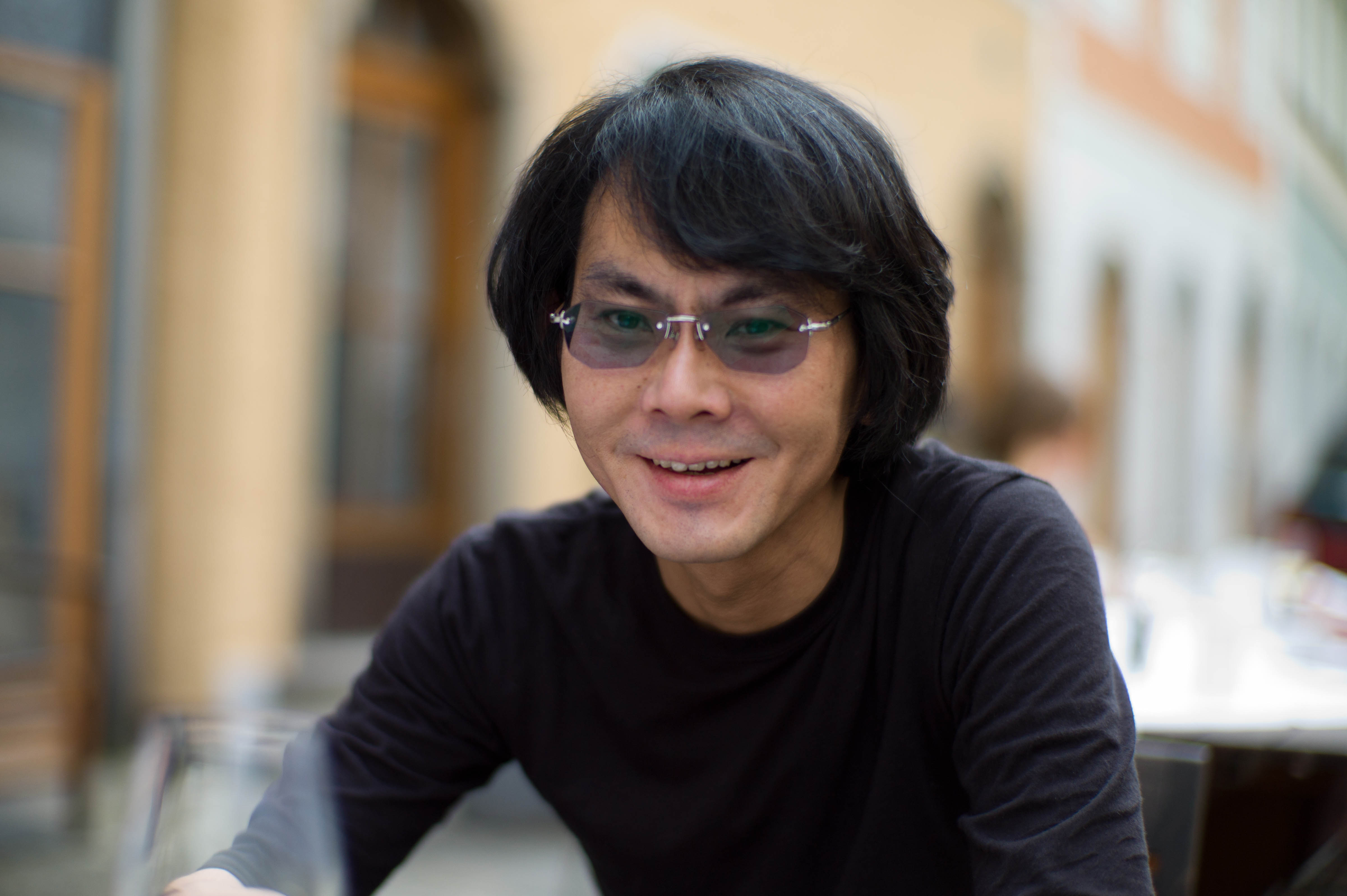
Ishiguro Hiroshi is a roboticist who in part designed Mindar.

Roboticist Ishiguro Hiroshi of Osaka University visited Kōdai-ji in July 2017. Gotō Tenshō, then the temple's chief steward, suggested to Ishiguro the creation of a robotic Buddha statue. They met again two months later and initially considered having several robots discussing the Buddha's teachings, though it was determined that a single robot would be preferable from a technical standpoint. A monologue on the Heart Sutra was chosen and it was decided that the android would take the form of Kannon, a bodhisattva associated with compassion. The Lotus Sutra mentions that Kannon is capable of manifesting in various forms.

The Android Kannon Production Committee was established in September 2017 and included staff from Kōdai-ji as well as engineers from Osaka University. Ishiguro proposed that the 'Alter' model of robot be used as a prototype. The subject matter of Mindar's sermon was determined by Buddhist monks of the Rinzai school—Honda Dōryū of Baishō-in, Sakaida Taisen of Kennin-ji, and Unrin'in Sōseki of Reigen-in. They devised a narrative explaining the Buddhist concepts of compassion and emptiness, based on works by Hajime Nakamura and Mumon Yamada. The name 'Mindar' was proposed by Ogawa Kōhei, a roboticist at Osaka University. (Note: The name 'Mindar' (Maindā) refers to "mind", though a monk from the committee described the name as referring more to kokoro, the Japanese term for heart, than the English term.) Mindar is not powered by artificial intelligence, though the designers originally had aspirations of endowing the android with machine-learning capabilities. Gotō said "This robot will never die; it will just keep updating itself and evolving. With AI, we hope it will grow in wisdom to help people overcome even the most difficult troubles. It's changing Buddhism."

The android Kannon was constructed at a robotics laboratory at Osaka University. Ogawa Kōhei engineered the android and it was completed in February 2019. The total cost of the project was ¥100 million (US$909,090), though development of the android only cost ¥25 million (US$227,250). A traditional Buddhist ceremony was held for the android upon its introduction to the public in March 2019. The ceremony was attended by monks and included chanting, bell-ringing, and drumming.

Mindar has historical precedents that were drawn on by its designers. Mechanized Karakuri puppets were produced in Japan from the 17th century and the country's first robot, the 11 ft (3.4 m) Gakutensoku, debuted in the late 1920s and could write calligraphy, change its facial expression, and move its head and hands through an air pressure mechanism. As a religion-oriented android, Mindar was preceded by other 21st-century robots, including the Chinese chatbot Robot Monk Xian'er and Pepper (produced 2015–2021), which could be programmed to perform Buddhist funeral rites, including chanting sutras and banging drums.

== Description ==
Mindar is a stationary, 1.95 m (6 ft 5 in) tall android, weighing 60 kg (130 lb). It has a slender mechatronic body made from aluminum with silicone skin covering its face, hands, and shoulders. Mindar stands on a platform and does not have working legs. It is capable of blinking and smiling, and moves its head, torso, and arms through air hydraulics. Mindar accompanies its preaching with a variety of gestures, such as joining its palms together in gasshō. A camera implanted in Mindar's left eye allows the android to give the impression of eye contact by focusing on a person. The top of Mindar's skull is exposed, showing blinking lights and wires within its cranial cavity. Similarly most of the android's body is not covered in silicone, exposing wires and servo motors. Similar to Ishiguro's telenoid robots, Mindar has an androgynous appearance. The voice has been described as feminine and soothing.

== Sermons ==
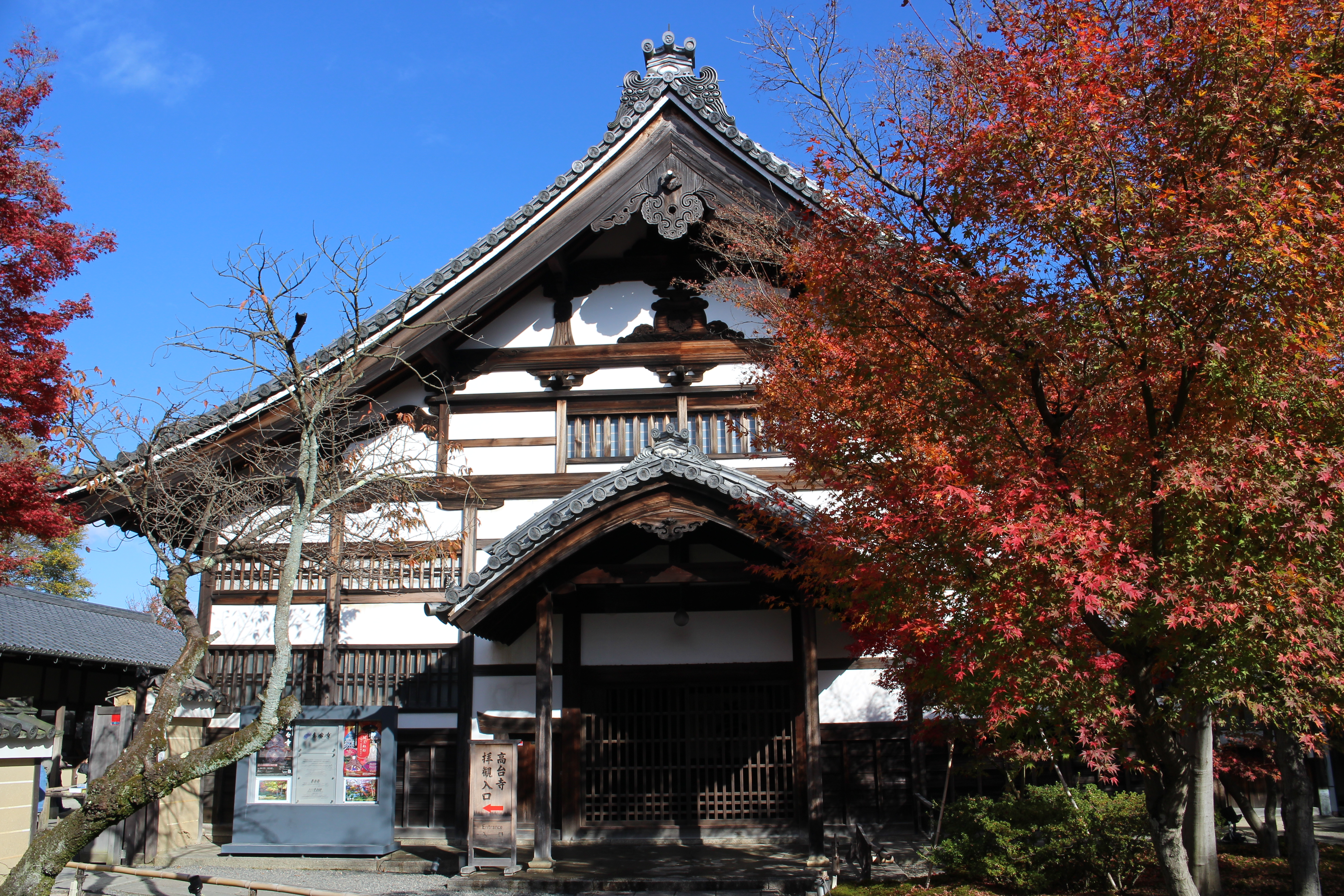
Mindar gives sermons from within the Kōdai-ji temple complex

Mindar is situated within the Kōdai-ji temple complex at Kyōka Hall. Its sermons are open to the public, and are typically given twice daily on Saturdays and Sundays.

Mindar gives a 25-minute sermon in Japanese on the Heart Sutra, addressing concepts of compassion and emptiness within Buddhism. Chinese and English subtitles are projected on the back wall of the room. In the pre-programmed sermon's introduction, a spotlight shines on Mindar, and the android begins speaking. It refers to itself as the bodhisattva, saying:

"As Kannon Bodhisattva, I can transcend time and space and transform into anything. As you can see, I have decided to meet you all in the form of an android..."

The multimedia presentation is accompanied by operatic piano music and augmented through 360-degree projection mapping, including the projection of a virtual audience on the walls of the room. Mindar interacts with members of the projected audience, answering their questions in a pre-programmed dialogue. The sermon ends with Mindar chanting the Heart Sutra.

== Reception ==
Mindar's introduction in 2019 received international news coverage. Media coverage focused on the novelty of a robot preacher, the cost of the project, and the potential for Mindar to change perceptions about Buddhism in Japan.

Public reception of Mindar has been mixed. A survey by Osaka University found that some people found the android easy to follow, surprisingly human-like, and warm, while others said that it felt unnatural or fake, with expressions that seemed engineered. Several people who have listened to Mindar's sermon have cried, with some considering the shadow cast by the android to be the "real" Kannon. Foreigners, especially those from Western countries, have been more critical of the android. Some raised concerns that the android upset the sanctity of religion, while others likened Mindar to Frankenstein's monster.

A 2020 paper in Frontiers in Artificial Intelligence discusses whether androids such as Mindar can express Buddha-nature. It concludes that Mindar could be considered an authentic incarnation of Kannon were it to become self-aware. A 2023 paper in the Journal of Experimental Psychology describes a field study based on interviews with people who had heard Mindar's sermon. The paper indicates that people do not assign android preachers the same credibility as they do for human preachers. The authors conclude that the automation of religious duties would likely result in a reduction of religious commitment.

== See also ==
- Buddhism and artificial intelligence
- Buddharoid
- Gabi (robot)
- Japanese robotics
