= BuddhaBot =

Chatbot trained on early Buddhist texts

BuddhaBot (Japanese: ブッダボット) is a chatbot trained on early Buddhist texts and designed to answers questions based on them. The project has been developed by a group led by Seiji Kumagai and Toshikazu Furuya at Kyoto University.

== History ==
=== BuddhaBot ===
The original BuddhaBot was developed by Kumanagi after challenged to do something in order to revitilize Buddhism in Japan by a monk in 2014. The idea of an chatbot had formed by 2019 after conversations with colleagues. BuddhaBot was unveiled on 12 March 2021. The model is based on BERT, developed by Google, and trained originally on the Sutta Nipāta, and later texts such as Udānavarga, and Dhammapada. The model is non-generative, responding to questions with preselected passages. While there were plans to make the model available for the public, as of June 2026 it has not been.

=== BuddhaBot-Plus ===
BuddhaBot-Plus, a more advanced model, was announced on 18 July 2023. It is a generative model based on ChatGPT that can make interpretations and explanations in natural language, again based on early Buddhist texts. To reduce problems caused by hallucinations scripture passages and generated text are displayed separately. Following a conference of esoteric Buddhism where BuddhaBot was exhibited in 2022, the Central Monastic Body in Bhutan showed interest in the technology, leading to an English language version of the model being developed in 2023. Starting in 2025 monastics in Bhutan are testing the bot accompanied with the development of guidelines for its use in a project involving Kyoto University, Teraverse Co. Ltd., and the Central Monastic Body. As of January 2026 around 450 monastics and researches of Buddhism were using the model. The model is planned to be made available for the Bhutanese public in 2027. In addition to Bhutan and Japan, according to developing group leader Kumagai, there has been interest from Buddhist communities located in Sri Lanka and Thailand.

BudhhaBot-Plus is used in the Buddharoid humanoid robot monk.

== Response ==
Former Foreign Minister of Bhutan, Tandi Dorji is positive about the possibility educating young people about Buddhism using BuddhaBot. Some Bhutanese monastics have also had a positive response to BuddhaBot.

Editor-in-chief of Chūgai Nippō, a specialist newspaper focusing on religion and culture, Akasaka (赤坂 (史人)), is of the opinion that artificial intelligence can not perceive the unique circumstances of people, and thus is unable of giving quality advice and guidance like humans are.

Takahiko Kameyama (亀山 隆彦), an associate professor at the Kyoto University Institute for the Future of Human Society, is of a similar opinion, writing that unlike the real Buddha, BuddhaBot lacks the ability to instantaneously grasp the skill level of its users and structure its explanations based on it, although he does think that it is an advance in the realm of Buddhist media.

== See also ==
- Buddhism and artificial intelligence
- Artificial intelligence in spirituality
