= Iesada =

- Gender: Male

Origin
- Origin: Japanese
- Meaning: "establish house"

Iesada (written: 家定) is a masculine Japanese given name. Notable people with the name include:

- Kinoshita Iesada (木下 家定) (1543–1608), Japanese samurai and daimyō
- Tokugawa Iesada (徳川 家定) (1824–1858), Japanese samurai, daimyo and shōgun
