= Mechanical Love =

Mechanical Love is a 2007 documentary by Danish filmmaker Phie Ambo about Hiroshi Ishiguro and his work on robots that resemble humans (gynoids and androids).
