= Kōdai-ji =

Temple in Kyoto, Japan

- 高台寺
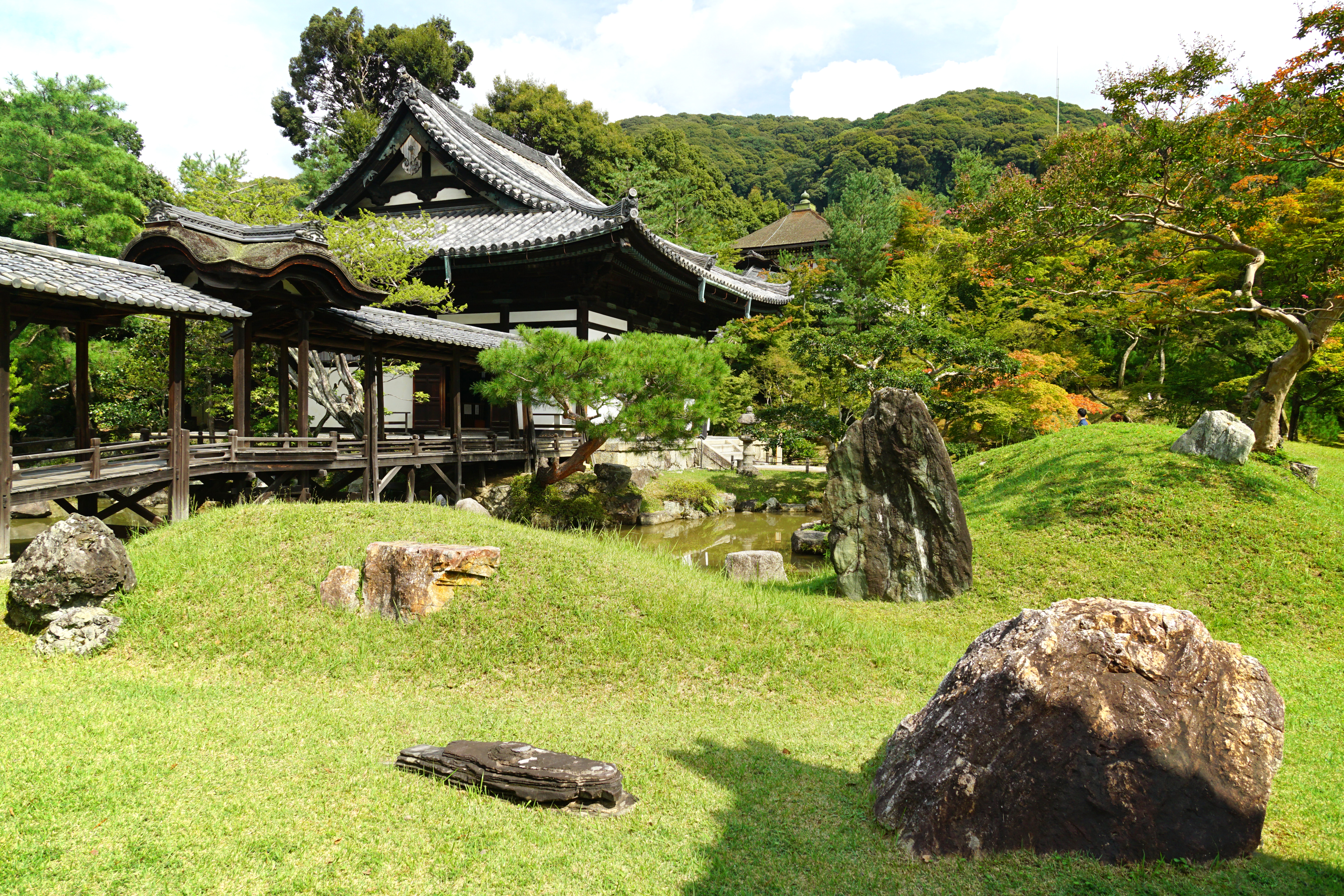
- Garden with Kangetsudai and Kaisan-dō

- Location within Kyoto Prefecture Location within Japan

Religion
- Affiliation: Buddhist
- Deity: Shaka Nyorai
- Rite: Rinzai school Kennin-ji-branch

Location
- Location: 526 Shimokawaracho, Shimokawara-dori Yasaka-torii-sagaru, Higashiyama-ku, Kyoto-shi, Kyoto-fu
- Country: Japan
- Interactive map of Kōdai-ji
- Coordinates: 35°0′2.74″N 135°46′52.01″E

Architecture
- Founder: Kōdai-in
- Funded by: Tokugawa Ieyasu
- Established: 1606
- Completed: 1606

Website
- Official website
- National Historic Site National Place of Scenic Beauty

Kōdai-ji (高台寺) is a Buddhist temple located in the Shimogawara neighborhood of Higashiyama-ku, Kyoto, Japan. It belongs to the Kenninji branch of the Rinzai school of Japanese Zen. Its sangō prefix is Jubuzan (鷲峰山), and its Main image is a statue Shaka Nyorai. Its precincts were designated a National Historic Site in 1966. The gardens of Kōdai-ji were designed by Kobori Enshū and are a nationally designated Place of Scenic Beauty.

== History ==
After Toyotomi Hideyoshi's death, his wife, Kita no Mandokoro, became a nun and was given the dharma name "Kōdai-in " by Emperor Go-Yōzei in 1603. She then made a vow to build a temple to commemorate Hideyoshi's soul, and Tokugawa Ieyasu supported the construction. Kōdai-ji was built on the grounds of once belonging to a temple called Unkō-ji, which had burned down during the Ōnin War. The temple was begun by relocating structures from other temples in Kyoto. The Kotoku-ji, which contained the grave of Hideyoshi's mother Ōmandokoro was located was relocated to the new site. Kōdai-in built a residence and one for her nephew Kinoshita Toshifusa to the west of Kōdai-ji, and later that same year moved her palace and its front garden from Fushimi Castle to make it her own residence. He also moved the abbot's quarters and a chashitsu from Fushimi Castle. Tokugawa Ieyasu appointed Kyoto Shoshidai Itakura Katsushige as the magistrate of construction and having his subordinate samurai work on the construction of the temple Among them Hori Naomasa was particularly significant, and a wooden statue of Naomasa is enshrined in the Kaisan-do Hall (Founder's Hall) of Kōdai-ji. The new temple was consecrated in 1606 as a Sōtō sect temple.

In July 1624, the temple converted from the Sōtō sect to the Rinzai sect. Kōdai-in's brother Kinoshita Iesada, had close ties to the Rinzai temple of Kennin-ji, where one of his son's was a monk. Kōdai-in died later that year, and her palace was converted into the tatchū sub-temple of Entoku-in by Kinoshita Toshifusa. It has since become the Kinoshita bodaiji.

On February 9, 1789, a fire broke out at Kōdai-ji, destroying the small abbot's quarters and the Refrectory. In 1795, the former palace of Kōdai-in, which had been located at Entoku-in, was dismantled and relocated to become Kōdai-ji's abbot's quarters. However, this structure was burned down on July 26, 1863, by anti-shogunate agitators who were upset by news that Matsudaira Shungaku intended to use the building as his residence in Kyoto.. In 1867, a group of former Shinsengumi samurai who had defected to the imperial side made Gesshin-in, a sub-temple of Kōdai-ji as their barracks. The group called themselves the "Imperial Throne Guards", claiming to be there to protect the tomb of Emperor Kōmei, but were annihilated in the Shinsengumi November that year.

Most of the structures of Kōdai-ji have been destroyed in fires, and the only structures remaining from the original construction are the Kaisan-do, the mausoleum (Otamaya), and to chashitsu teahouses. The interior decoration of the mausoleum (Otamaya) uses Momoyama-style lacquerware, which is called "Kodaiji lacquerware."

The android Mindar has given sermons on the Heart Sutra at Kōdai-ji since 2019.

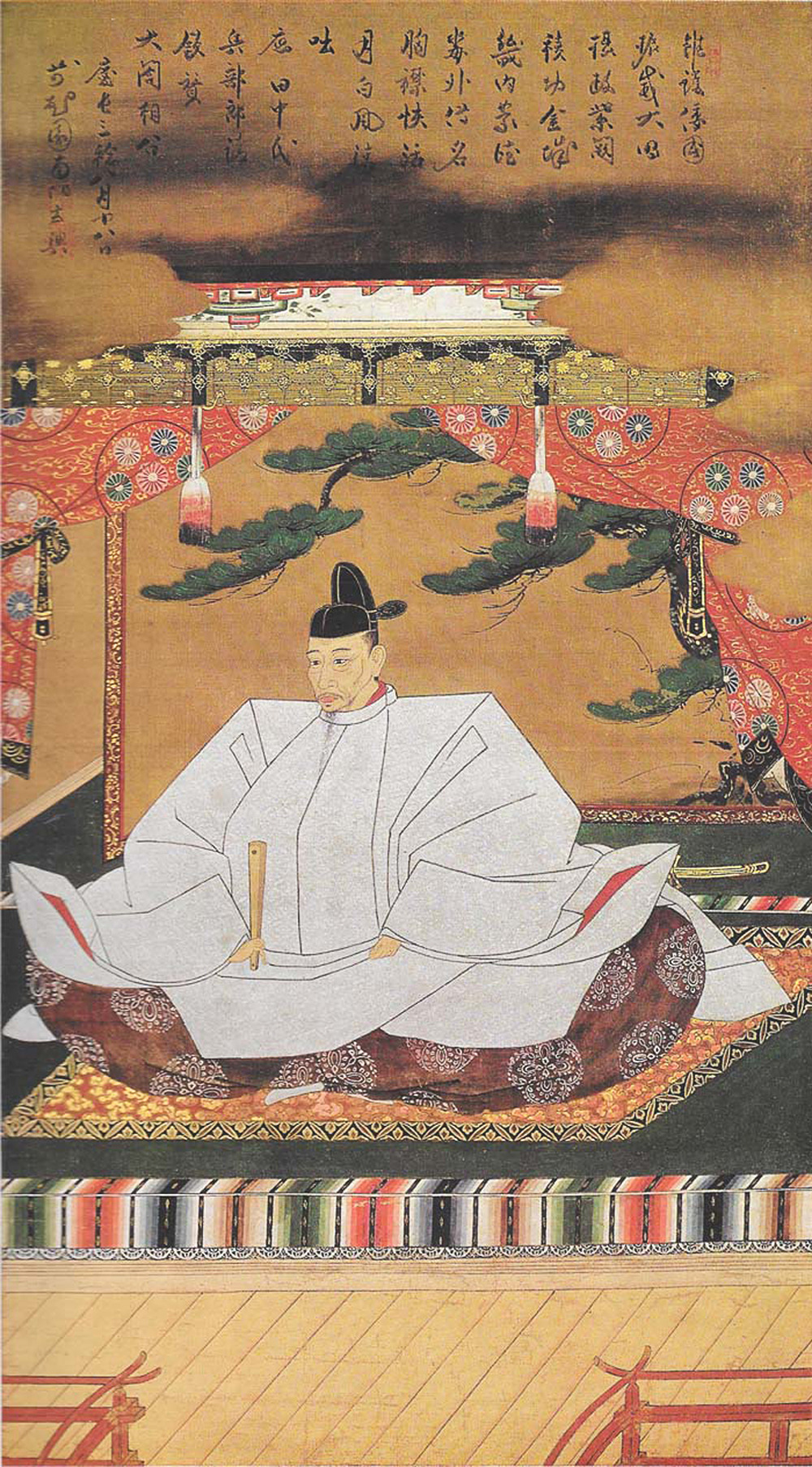
Portrait of Toyotomi Hideyoshi, kept at Kōdai-ji's treasury, is registered as an Important Cultural Asset

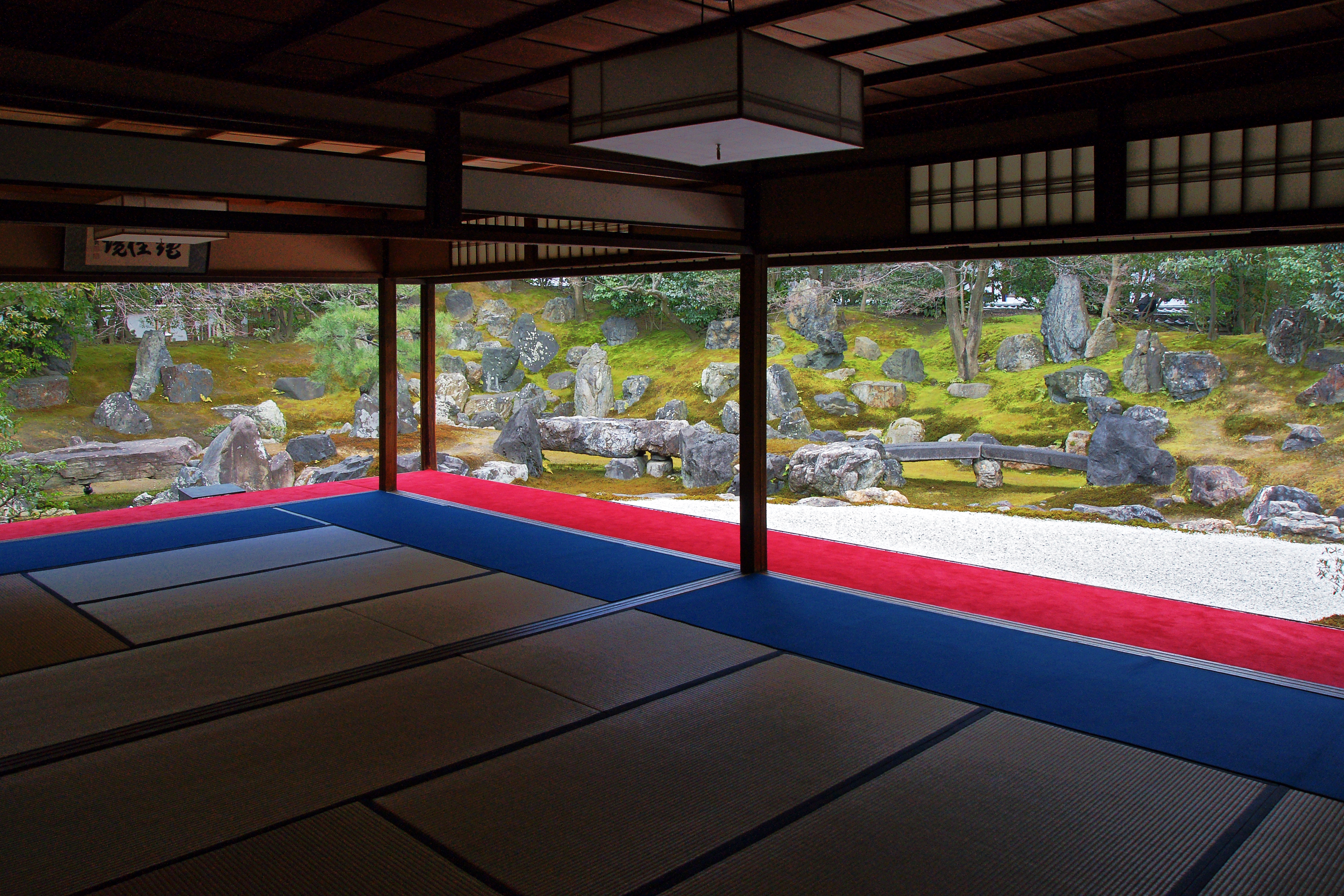
Gardens of Kōdai-ji

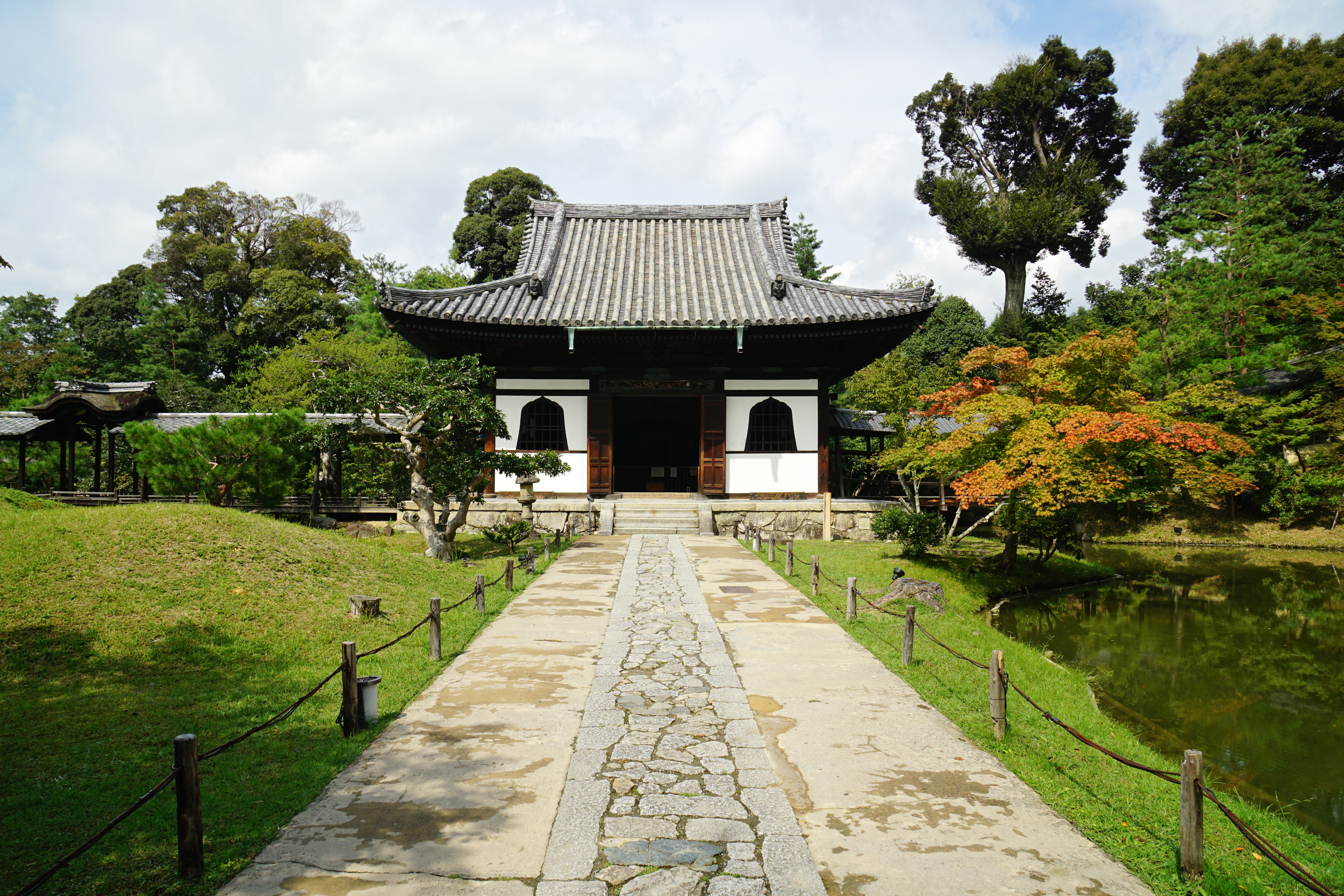
Kaisan-do

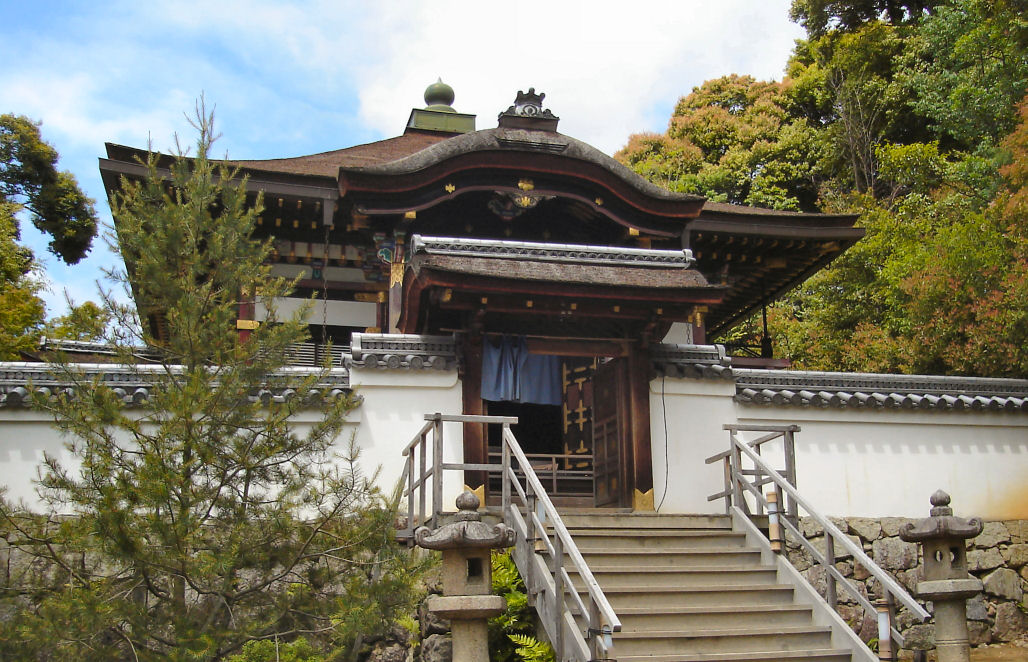
Otamaya

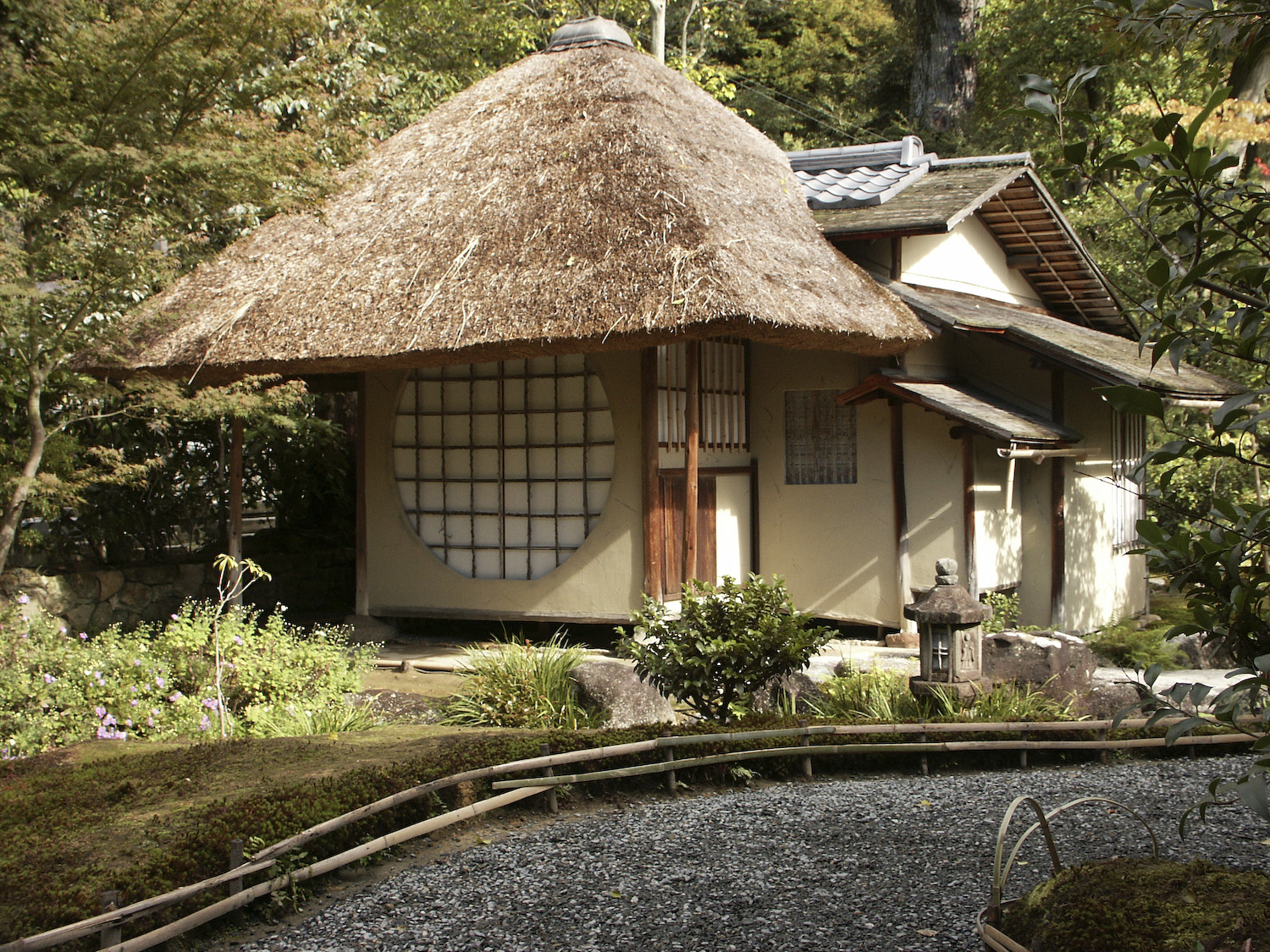
Ihō-an, a teahouse in the temple's grounds

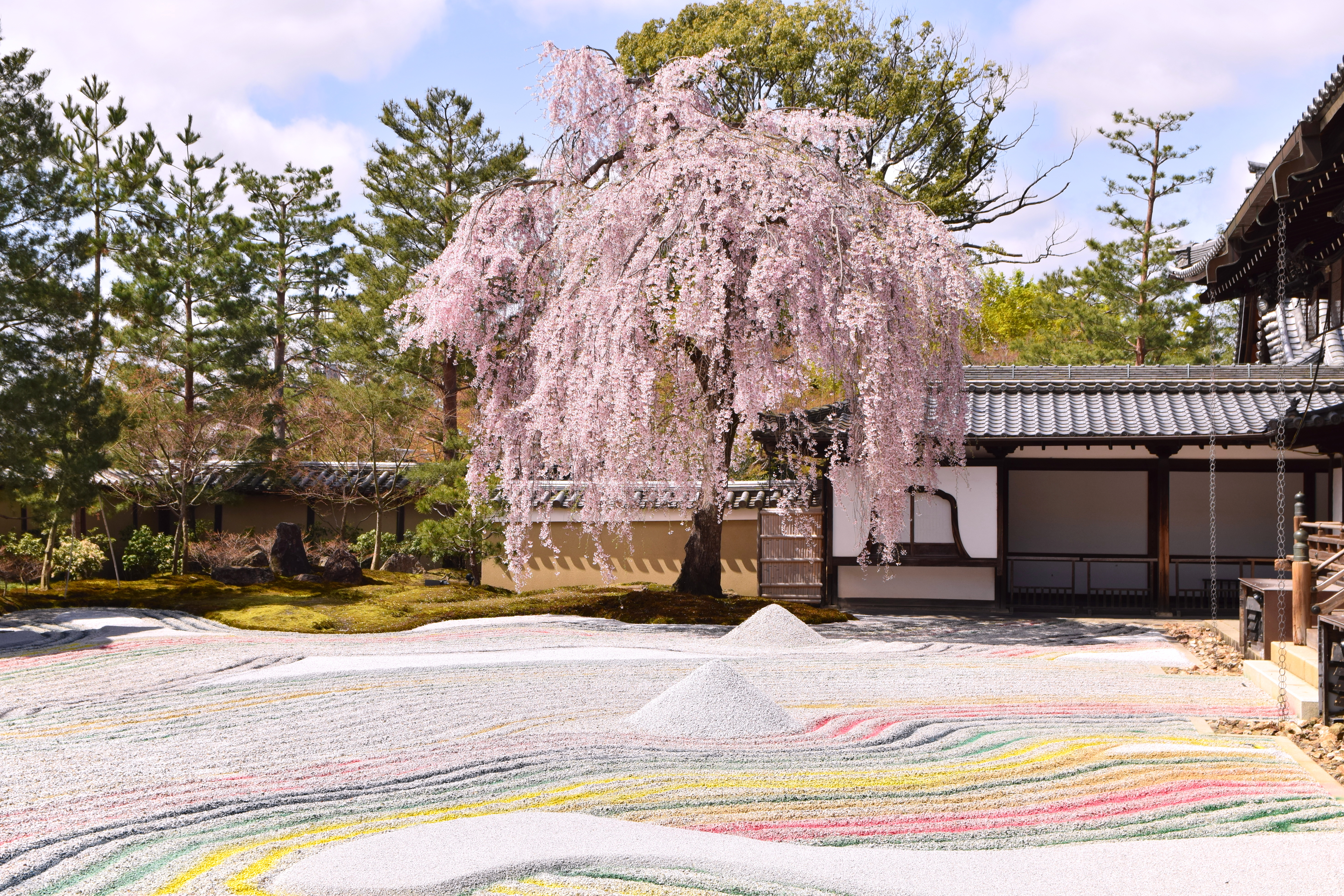
Hashin-tei gravel garden in spring

The temple possesses a number of objects designated as Important Cultural Assets. Among these are the Sanmon and the Otamaya, noted for its use of maki-e. Lacquerware has a tradition at this temple. The temple is nicknamed the "maki-e temple". One of the maki-e patterns used on a natsume tea utensil is called Kōdai-ji bun natsume (高台寺文棗), featuring the imperial chrysanthemum seal and the paulownia seal of the regent.

The treasury also holds paintings, including one of Hideyoshi, as well as textiles, and a bronze bell with an inscription dating it to 1606.

== See also ==
- Ryozen Kannon, neighbouring shrine
- List of Historic Sites of Japan (Kyoto)
- List of Places of Scenic Beauty of Japan (Kyoto)
