= Buddharoid =

Japanese robotic monk

- Country: Japan
- Year of creation: 2026
- Type: Humanoid
- Purpose: Giving sermons

Buddharoid (Japanese: ブッダロイド) is a Japanese AI-powered robot monk developed by researchers at Kyoto University in collaboration with other tech companies. The robot is designed to provide spiritual guidance, similar to a real life Buddhist monks. It was unveiled at Shoren-in Temple in Kyoto.

The robot is built with system called BuddhaBot-Plus, based on AI derived from OpenAI's ChatGPT. The system has been trained on Buddhist scriptures to answer personal and social questions and give religious or spiritual advice. The robot is based on the hardware from Chinese company Unitree G1's humanoid Robotics.

The robot was created in respond to the growing aging population crisis in Japan, where declining religious participation, an aging population, and a lack of successors are expected to cause about 30% of Buddhist temples to disappear by 2040.

== See also ==
- Gabi (robot) – another similar humanoid robot developed in South Korea
- Mindar – similar humanoid robot preacher in Kyoto, Japan
- Japanese robotics
