= Hiroshi Ishiguro =

Japanese roboticist

- 石黒浩
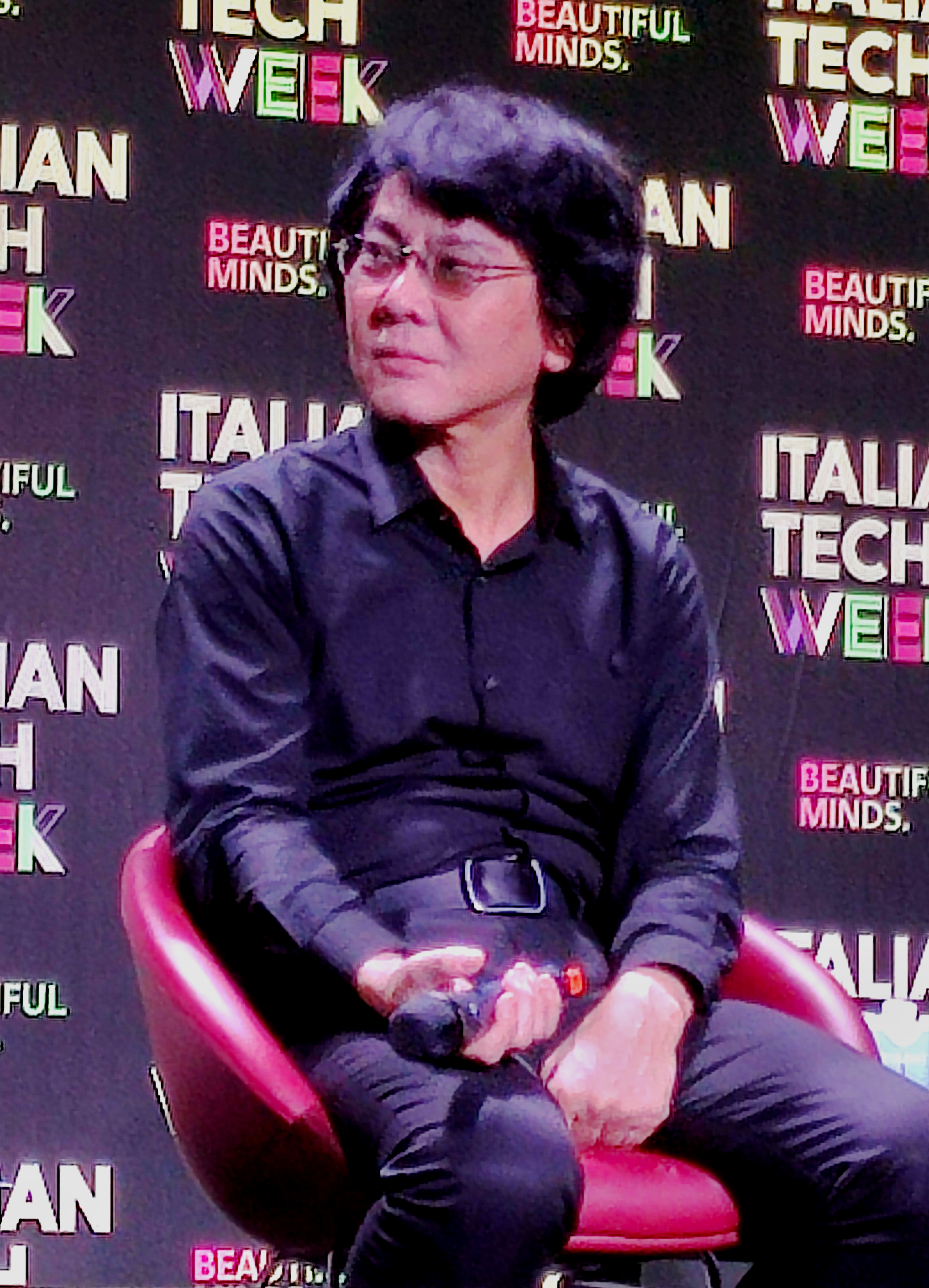
- Ishiguro in 2023
- Born: 23 October 1963 (age 63); Shiga, Kansai, Japan
- Education: University of Yamanashi; Osaka University
- Occupations: Roboticist, engineer
- Employer: Osaka University

Hiroshi Ishiguro (石黒浩, Ishiguro Hiroshi; born 23 October 1963) is a Japanese roboticist and engineer. He is the director of the Intelligent Robotics Laboratory, part of the Department of Systems Innovation in the Graduate School of Engineering Science at Osaka University, Japan. A notable development of the laboratory is the Actroid, a humanoid robot with lifelike appearance and visible behaviour such as facial movements.

== Early life and education ==
Hiroshi was born in Shiga, Kansai, on 23 October 1963. In his youth he loved oil painting and wanted to become an artist. Instead, he studied computer science at University of Yamanashi and later engineering at Graduate School of Engineering Science of Osaka University.

== Robotics career ==
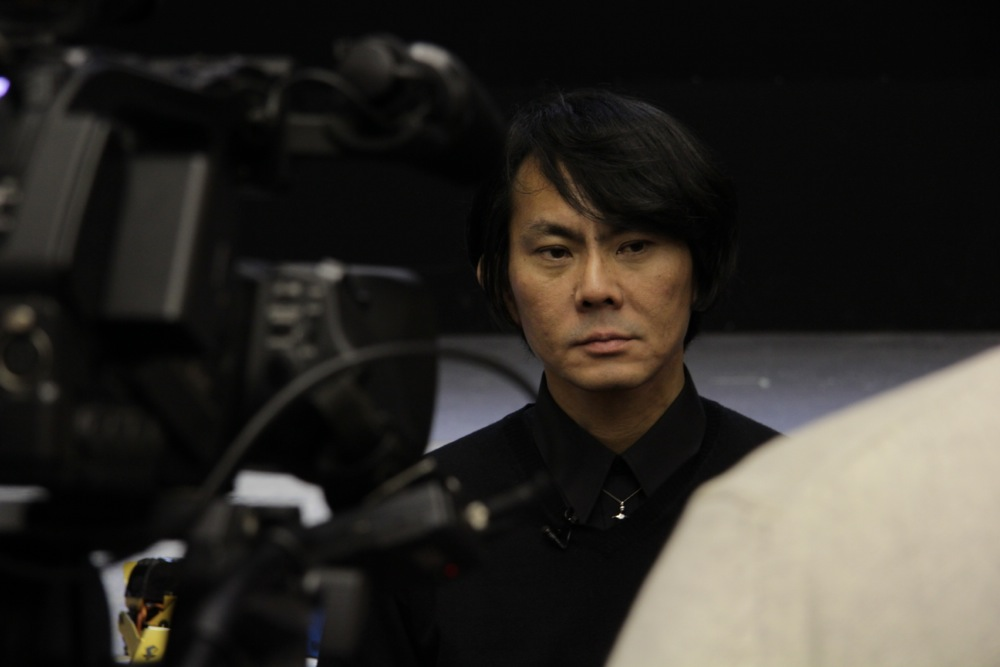
Ishiguro in 2011

In robot development, Ishiguro concentrates on the idea of making a robot that is as similar as possible to a living human being. At the unveiling in July 2005 of the gynoid Repliee Q1Expo (in the cybernetic world, the term for female android, gynoid, from ancient Greek "gyne", that is woman) he was quoted as saying, "I have developed many robots before, but I soon realised the importance of its appearance. A human-like appearance gives a robot a strong feeling of presence. ... Repliee Q1Expo can interact with people. It can respond to people touching it. It's very satisfying, although we obviously have a long way to go yet." In his opinion, it may be possible to build an android that is indistinguishable from a human, at least during a brief encounter.

Ishiguro has made an android that resembles him, called the Geminoid. The Geminoid was among the robots featured by James May in his 5 October 2008 BBC2 documentary on robots Man-Machine in May's series Big Ideas. He also introduced a telecommunication robot called the Telenoid R1. Hiroshi also uses the android to teach his classes at Osaka University of Japan and likes to scare his students by making Geminoid do human-like movements like blinking, "breathing" and fidgeting with his hands. Ishiguro has been listed, in 2011, as one of the 15 Asian Scientists to Watch by Asian Scientist Magazine. In 2018, Ishiguro was interviewed interacting with one of his robots for the documentary on artificial intelligence Do You Trust This Computer?

Ishiguro and other roboticists from Osaka University designed the Buddhist android preacher Mindar in collaboration with staff from the Kōdai-ji temple.

== Career timeline ==
He graduated the University of Yamanashi in 1986 and he graduate from the Graduate School of Engineering Science at Osaka University in 1991.

- 1994.10: Associate Professor at Kyoto University
- 1998.3: Visiting Fellow of University of California, San Diego
- 2000.4: Associate Professor of Wakayama University
- 2001.4: Professor of Wakayama University
- 2003.4: Professor of Osaka University

== Awards ==
- 2011 Osaka Culture Prize
- Prize for Science and Technology by the Minister of Education, Culture, Sports, Science and Technology (MEXT), April 2015
- Best paper award at the 4th ACM/IEEE International Conference on Human-Robot Interaction (HRI 2009), March 2009
- Best paper and poster awards at the 2nd ACM/IEEE International Conference on Human-Robot Interaction (HRI 2007), March 2007
- Best Humanoid Award (Kid size) at RoboCup 2006 (Bremen, Germany)

== Publications ==
=== Publications ===
- Hornyak, Tim (2006). "Android Science" (PDF). Scientific American. 294 (5): 32–34. Bibcode:2006SciAm.294e..32H. doi:10.1038/scientificamerican0506-32. PMID 16708485.
- Kanda, Takayuki; Ishiguro, Hiroshi (2012). Human-Robot Interaction in Social Robotics. CRC Press. ISBN 978-1466506978.
- Ishiguro, Hiroshi (2020). How Human Is Human? The View from Robotics Research. Tokyo: Japan Publishing Industry Foundation for Culture.

=== Papers ===
- "Publications". Intelligent Robotics Laboratory (IRL). Osaka University.

== Film appearances ==
- Mechanical Love (2007) Ishiguro and his work forms a major component of this documentary on the interrelationship between humans and robots.
- Surrogates (2009) During the opening montage showing the development of the surrogates, there appears footage of Ishiguro and his Geminoid.
- Plug & Pray (2010) Ishiguro is one of the scientists featured in the film
- Samsara (2011)
- Robolove (2019) Documentary on the strategies of men and women involved with the creation of humanoid, android robots
