= Kōdai-in =

Japanese aristocratic lady (1546–1624)

Kita no Mandokoro Kōdai-in
- 高台院
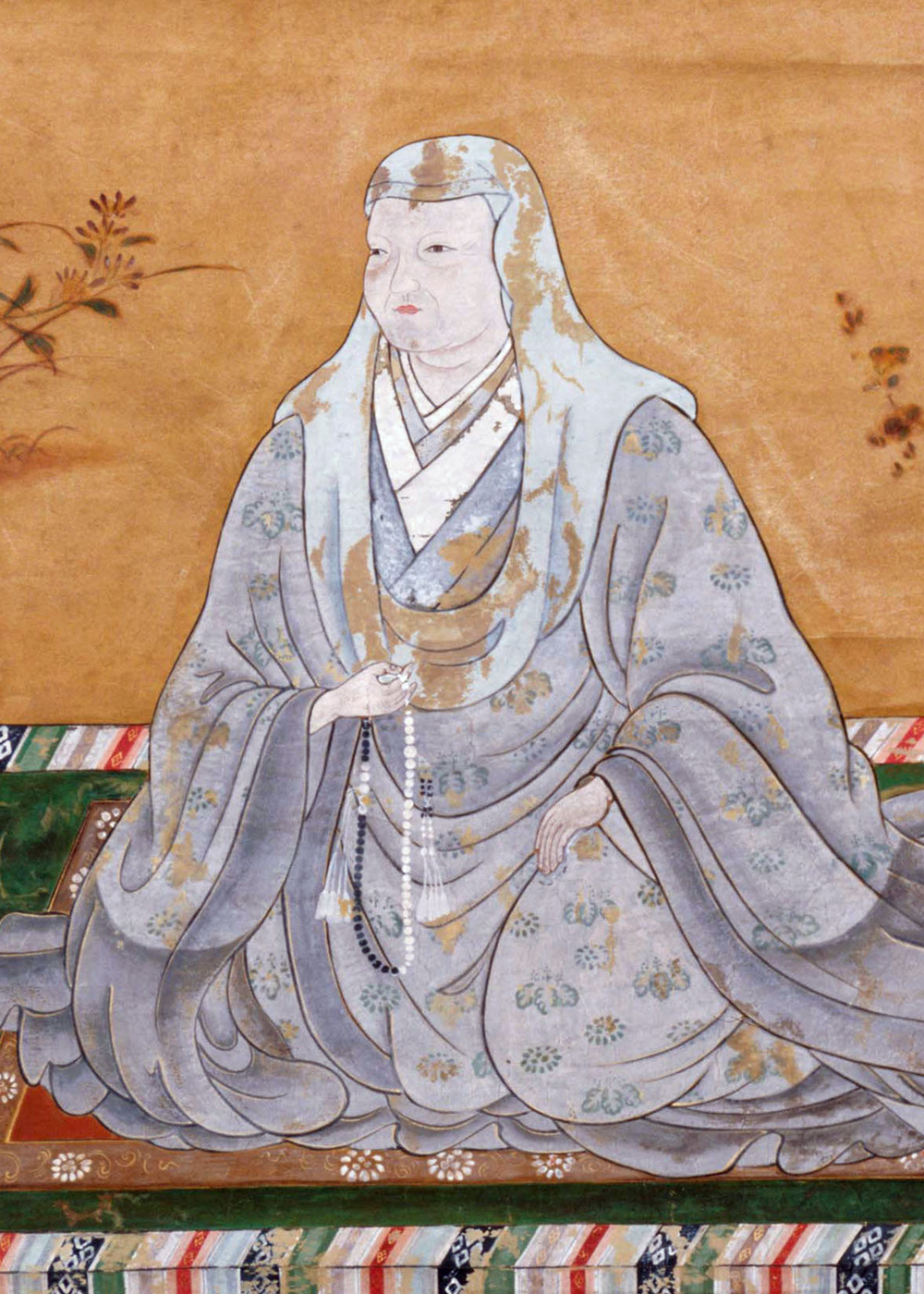
- Kōdai-in in nun's robe

Castellan of Kyōto New castle (Yamashiro Province)
- In office 1599–1623

Personal life
- Born: 1540s Owari Province, Japan
- Died: October 17, 1624 Kōdai-ji, Kyoto, Japan
- Resting place: Otama-ya, Kōdai-ji, Kyoto, Japan
- Spouse: Toyotomi Hideyoshi (m. 1561; died 1598)
- Children: none
- Parents: Sugihara Sadatoshi (father); Asahi-dono (mother)
- Other names: Nene; Toyotomi Yoshiko
- Posthumous name: Hikari no Tenshi

Religious life
- Religion: Buddhism
- Temple: Kōdai-ji
- Dharma name: Kōdai-in Kogetsuni
- Consecration: Kōdai-ji

Senior posting
- Based in: Kyoto, Japan

Kōdai-in (高台院) (died October 17, 1624), formerly known as Nene (ねね), One (おね), Nei (ねい), was an aristocrat and Buddhist nun, founder of the temple Kōdai-ji in Kyoto, Japan. She was formerly the principal samurai wife of Toyotomi Hideyoshi under the name of Toyotomi Yoshiko (豊臣 吉子). When she rose in higher political status, she took the title of "Kita no mandokoro". As the matriarch figure of the Toyotomi clan, she led all diplomatic affairs that had to do with the imperial court, and monitored the daimyos' families who were being held hostage at Osaka Castle.

== Early life ==
Kōdai-in was born in Owari Province between 1541 and 1549. She was the second daughter of Sugihara Sadatoshi, a descendant of Taira no Sadamori, and the Emperor Kammu (735-806). She was adopted by her maternal uncle Asano Nagakatsu, a descendant of the Toki clan, of Minamoto no Yorimitsu (944-1021), and the Emperor Seiwa (850-881). According to the "Hankanpu" (Genealogy of the Protectors of the Shogunate), she was first supposed to marry Maeda Toshiie, but she became the wife of Hideyoshi.

== As Hideyoshi's wife ==
Around 1561, she married Hashiba Hideyoshi, a man who would later become one of the three great unifiers of Japan, although at the time of their marriage he had yet to gain much fame, and despite her mother Asahi-dono's opposition to this marriage, because of the difference in social status with her husband. Nene was his principal wife and also one of his favorite wives. In 1585, after Hideyoshi was appointed to the post of Imperial Regent (Kampaku), Nene took on the title of "Kita no mandokoro."

As the wife of Hideyoshi, Nene is most famous for being one of his closest aides and confidantes. The daughter of a samurai, she had many familial connections that netted Hideyoshi several retainers. Among these retainers were Sugihara Ietsugu (Nene's uncle), Kinoshita Iesada (Nene's brother), Kobayakawa Hideaki (Nene's nephew) and Asano Nagamasa (Nene's brother-in-law). The last of these characters would serve as an important official in Hideyoshi's later administration. Nene was known to have been an intelligent woman who, at times, advised Hideyoshi on matters of governance by sending him letters. When Hideyoshi repealed the tax exemptions he had granted to the residents living in his headquarters at Nagahama, Nene appealed to him to reinstate the exemptions, and he did. It is also recorded that Hideyoshi frequently wrote letters to Nene to tell her about how his campaigns were going. Hideyoshi did this after his invasion of Sassa Narimasa's territory in Japan's Hokuriku region and after his campaign against the Shimazu clan.

When Hideyoshi unified Japan, Nene often went with him to attend parties. She was courteous and respectful to her guests on every occasion. When Emperor Go-Yozei visited Hideyoshi's mansion with his entourage in 1588, Nene freely distributed a plethora of gifts to Hideyoshi's visitors. She also received the rank of Juichii from the Emperor himself. During Japanese invasions of Korea, Nene assisted the Toyotomi army by giving advice on how to transfer supplies from Japan to Korea.

Though adored, Nene often found herself competing with other women for Hideyoshi's attention. In a letter to Nene, Oda Nobunaga also noted that Hideyoshi was somewhat dissatisfied with Nene. Hideyoshi took up several concubines. Nene did not bear any children.

=== Letter from Oda Nobunaga ===
...It has been quite some time since I last saw you, but your beauty grows day by day. Tokichiro [Hideyoshi] constantly complains about you, which is outrageous. While that "bald rat" [Hideyoshi] scrambles to find another good woman, you remain lofty and elegant. Do not be envious; show Hideyoshi this letter.

== As Hideyoshi's widow ==
Nene worried about Hideyoshi often when he was on his deathbed. Eventually, as Hideyoshi was on his last throes, she petitioned the Imperial Court to sponsor a sacred dance ritual to pray for and expedite Hideyoshi's recovery.

After Hideyoshi died in 1598, Nene became a nun and assumed the dharma name of Kōdai-in Kogetsuni. She was respected as a maternal figure for many retainers of the Toyotomi clan who proved to be loyal to her even after Hideyoshi's death. She gave up the eastern ward of Osaka Castle to Tokugawa Ieyasu and relocated herself to the imperial palace. Nene had a captivating and gentle personality, so she gained the respect of many; she helped and housed many women related to the Western Army (commanded by Ishida Mitsunari) after the Battle of Sekigahara.

In 1602, after the Battle of Sekigahara, she had an audience with the mother of Tokugawa Ieyasu, Odai no Kata and Emperor Goyozei.

In 1603, Nene attended Toyotomi Hideyori and Senhime's wedding. In 1606 with the help of Tokugawa Ieyasu, she established a Buddhist temple Kōdai-ji in Kyoto, to which she moved. It became the burial area for her husband, his mother, and later Toyotomi Hideyori. During the contest between Toyotomi Hideyori and Tokugawa Ieyasu for supremacy (Siege of Osaka), Kōdai-in intended to persuade Yodo-dono to submit to the Tokugawa, but Ieyasu prevented her from going to Osaka.

== Death ==
After her death in 1624 and burial within the temple compound of Kodai-ji, she was posthumously given the name of Hikari no Tenshi or "Angel of Light".

Her remains would later be unearthed to make way for the sanctuary known as Otama-ya. Upon its completion, her remains were interred there, and placed under the wooden statue of herself, alongside the statue of Hideyoshi.

== Legacy ==
The life of this prominent resident of Kyoto is still commemorated in a short street which bears her name. Nene's Street (ねねの道, Nene-no-Michi) remains lined with structures built in traditional Kyoto style. Nene-no-Michi is located in Higashiyama Ward in eastern Kyoto near Kōdai-ji, Maruyama Park and Yasaka Shrine.

She is also a prominent figure in the 2025 action role-playing game game Assassin's Creed Shadows.

== Mikazuki Munechika (sword) ==
Sword made by Sanjō Munechika (三条宗近), One of the Five Swords under Heaven (天下五剣); the name "Mikazuki (三日月)", meaning "crescent moon" refers to the shape of the tempering pattern; owned by Kōdai-in, wife of Toyotomi Hideyoshi who bequeathed it to Tokugawa Hidetada, then handed down in the Tokugawa clan.

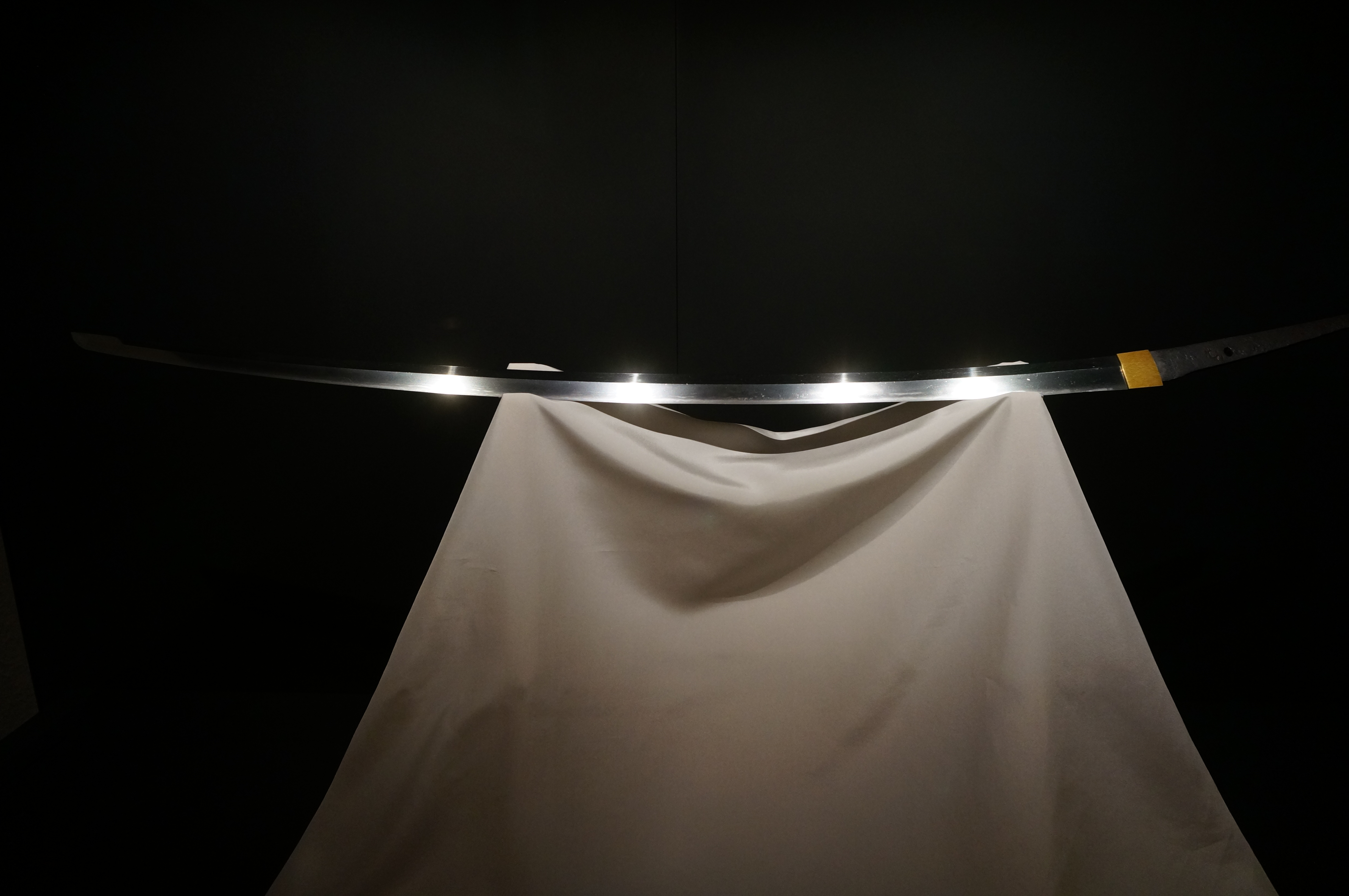
Mikazuki Munechika, the sword once owned by Kōdai-in.

== Honours ==
- Junior First Rank (April 19, 1588)

== See also ==
- List of female castellans in Japan
