= Gabi (robot) =

South Korean robot monk

- Country: South Korea
- Year of creation: 2026
- Type: Humanoid

Gabi (Korean: 가비) is a South Korean humanoid robot monk introduced by the Jogye Order of Korean Buddhism. It was introduced during a Buddhist precept ceremony held at Jogyesa Temple in Seoul on May 6, 2026, to modernize Buddhism and connect to the country's younger generations.

According to The Korea Times, the name "Gabi" is derived from references to Siddhartha and the Korean word for mercy.

The robot is approximately 130 centimeters tall and is based on the Unitree G1 humanoid platform. It wears traditional Buddhist robes, bows before monks, and can verbally respond to ritual prompts. The robot serves as an honorary monk and was designed to participate in the Lotus Lantern Festival and other celebrations for Buddha's Birthday held in South Korea. The Jogye Order cultural affairs head Ven. Seong Won told Reuters that the initiative is an early test for humans and robots to coexist as AI and robotics become more integrated into society.

== See also ==
- Buddharoid – another similar humanoid robot developed in Japan
- Mindar – a Japanese robotic Buddhist preacher
- Robot Monk Xian'er
- South Korean robotics
