= Sayonara (2015 film) =

- Poster

Japanese name
- Kanji: さようなら
Transcriptions
- Revised Hepburn: Sayōnara
- Directed by: Kōji Fukada
- Screenplay by: Kōji Fukada
- Based on: a play by Oriza Hirata
- Produced by: Keisuke Konishi; Hiroyuki Onogawa; Kōji Fukada; Bryerly Long
- Starring: Bryerly Long; Geminoid F
- Cinematography: Akiko Ashizawa
- Edited by: Naohiro Urabe; Koji Fukada
- Music by: Hiroyuki Onogawa
- Production companies: Phantom Film; K&AG; Tokyo Garage; AtomX; Addix; Letre; Katsu-do
- Release dates: October 2015 (Tokyo); November 21, 2015 (Japan)
- Running time: 112 minutes
- Country: Japan
- Languages: Japanese; English; French; German

Sayonara (Japanese: さようなら, Hepburn: Sayōnara; lit. "Goodbye") is a 2015 Japanese film written and directed by Kōji Fukada and based on the short play of the same name by Oriza Hirata. Starring Bryerly Long and Geminoid F, the film was promoted as "the first movie to feature a Gynoid performing opposite a human actor". It premiered in October 2015 at the Tokyo International Film Festival and was scheduled for release in Japan on November 21, 2015.

== Cast ==
- Bryerly Long as Tanya
- Geminoid F
- Hirofumi Arai
- Makiko Murata
- Nijirō Murakami
- Yukio Kibiki
- Jérôme Kircher
- Irene Jacob
- Noémie Nakai

== Release ==
The world premiere of the film was in October 2015, at the Tokyo International Film Festival. The film was then released in Japan on November 21, 2015.

== Reception ==
=== Critical reception ===
Peter Debruge of Variety called the film a "dreary study of human-robot relations [that] offers little to engage apart from its pretty scenery."

Deborah Young of The Hollywood Reporter called the film a "dark, hopeless and pretty depressing [...] post-apocalyptic Japanese mood piece".

=== Accolades ===
The film was in competition at the 2015 Tokyo International Film Festival.
