= Telenoid R1 =

Remote-controlled telepresence android

The Telenoid R1 is a remote-controlled telepresence android created by Japanese roboticist Hiroshi Ishiguro. The R1 model, released in August 2010, is approximately 80 cm tall, weighs 5 kg and is made out of silicone rubber. The primary usage of the Telenoid R1 is an audio and movement transmitter through which people can relay messages over long distances. The purpose is for the user to feel as though they are communicating with a far-away acquaintance. Cameras and microphones capture the voice and movements of an operator which are projected through the Telenoid R1 to the user.

== Features ==
Release	August 2010
Height	Approximately 80 cm
Weight	Approximately 5 kg
Sensor	None
Actuator	Servo Motor
Power	External DC Power Resource
CPU	One microcontroller (ARM7 60 Hz) is embedded. An external PC is used for Telenoid control.
Degree of Freedom	3 for eyeballs, 1 for mouth, 3 for neck, and 2 for arms
Exterior Material	Silicone

The Telenoid R1, unlike its counterparts the Geminoid HI-1 and Geminoid F, is designed to be an ambiguous figure, able to be recognized as any gender and any age. The Telenoid R1 has a minimalistic design; it is roughly the size of an infant with a bald head, a doll-like face, and automated stubs instead of arms. It contains 9 actuators which allows the R1 to have 9 degrees of freedom. Each eye can move horizontally independent from each other, but their vertical movement is synced. The mouth is able to open and close to emulate talking. The 3 actuators in the neck provide yaw, pitch, and roll rotations for the neck. The final two actuators are used for motion in the arms. A webcam or other video capturing device can record a person's movements and voice and send them to the R1 using Wi-Fi connection. Some movements and expressions are pre-programmed into the Telenoid R1. Some of these controllable behaviors are saying bye, being happy, and motioning for a hug. Other actions are random such was breathing and blinking which gives the R1 a sense of being "alive."

== Uses ==
The R1's main use is being an advanced video conferencing tool. The Telenoid is able to interact with the owner as if it was the person sending the message. Researchers shared that they hope the Telenoid R1 will be used mainly as a communication device that can be applied to work, education, and elderly care.

=== Work communication ===
Employees who are unable to go into work can use the Telenoid R1 to give their input into a conversation or meeting. Furthermore, entire meetings can be held through Telenoids so that workers never even have to leave their homes.

=== Education ===
One education application for the robot is teaching a language. Audio lessons can be programmed into the Telenoid R1 and used to teach people who would find it easier to learn from a human-like being rather than an audio tape.

=== Elderly care ===
Elderly citizens in care homes are able to use the Telenoid R1 to communicate with family who are not able to visit them personally. Research has shown that elderly people have reacted positively to interactions with the Telenoid R1. In experiments with the R1, the elderly have given feedback such as "very cute, like my grandchild" and "very soft and nice to touch."

== Cost ==
The Telenoid R1 uses DC motors as actuators and because of its smaller body, only uses 9. This helped to reduce the development and production costs for the automaton. A version of the robot used for research costs about $35,000 while a commercial version costs about $8,000.

== Previous models ==
=== Geminoid HI-1 ===
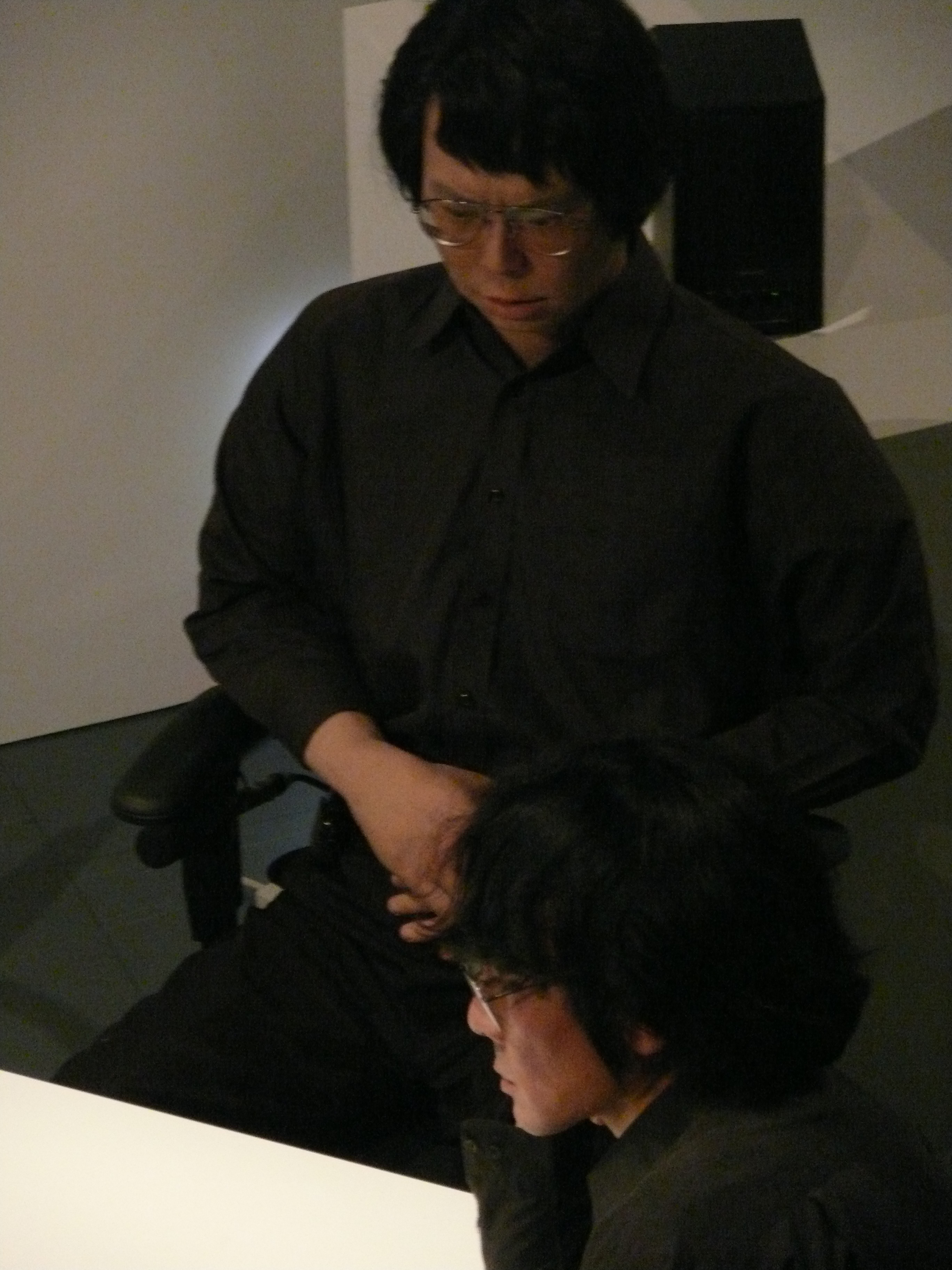
Ishiguro and Geminoid HI-1 in 2009

Hiroshi Ishiguro created an automaton with looks that reflect his own, the Geminoid HI-1. The materials for this robot include Ishiguro's own hair along with silicone rubber, pneumatic actuators, and various electronic parts. The purpose for the HI-1 is to mimic the actions of a human. It cannot move by itself, but is instead remotely operated by Ishiguro. Ishiguro's voice is captured by a microphone while his facial movements are recorded by a camera. The HI-1 is able to imitate the actions made by the operator. When asked the purpose of a human-like robot, Ishiguro replied with "my research question is to know what is human." Ishiguro hopes to use the HI-1 as a way to decipher the feeling of being in the presence of a human being.

=== Geminoid F ===
Another of Hiroshi Ishiguro's creations is the Geminoid F, a female android modeled after a woman in her twenties. The Geminoid F can show facial expressions, such as smiling or frowning, in a more natural looking way than Ishiguro's previous androids. This Geminoid is also controlled remotely by cameras with face-tracking software. The goal in making the Geminoid F was to create a robot that can display a wide range of facial expressions using fewer actuators than earlier models. While the Geminoid HI-1 has 50 actuators, the Geminoid F only has 12. Instead of filling a large external box with compressors and valves, as seen in the HI-1, the researchers implemented these parts into the body of the Geminoid F, so it requires only a small external compressor. Researchers hope that the Geminoid F has a more friendly face that people are more eager to interact with. Geminoid F co-starred in the 2015 Japanese film Sayonara, promoted as "the first movie to feature an android performing opposite a human actor".
