= Kinoshita Iesada =

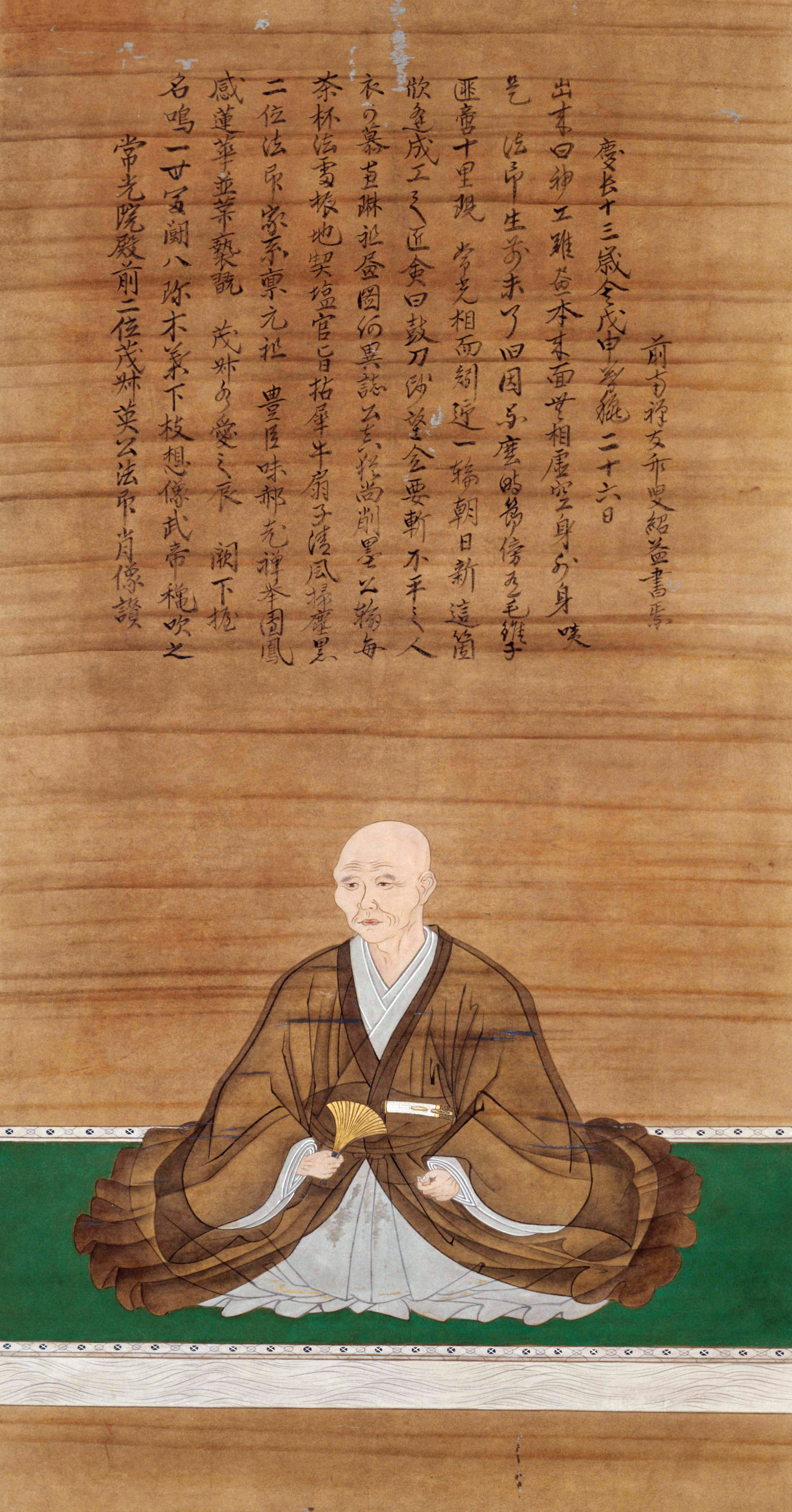
Kinoshita Iesada

Kinoshita Iesada (木下 家定, 1543 – October 4, 1608) was a samurai of the Sengoku through early Edo periods. He was the son of Sugihara Sadatoshi. Born Sugihara Magobei (杉原孫兵衛), he later took the new family name Kinoshita ("under the tree"), possibly to show his support for his brother-in-law, the general who would become known as Toyotomi Hideyoshi.

At the time of the Battle of Sekigahara, Iesada was lord of Himeji han and held 25,000 koku of income. However, due to his distinction in guarding his sister O-ne (Hideyoshi's wife), Tokugawa Ieyasu rewarded him, and he was enfeifed at Ashimori han in Bitchu Province following the battle.

Iesada's children included Katsutoshi, Toshifusa, Nobutoshi, Toshisada, and Hideaki. Toshifusa, his second son, succeeded him.
