= Japanese robotics =

Japanese robots

In Japan, popular robots include humanoid entertainment robots, androids, animal robots, social robots, guard robots, and more. Each type has a variety of characteristics.

Japan employs over a quarter of a million industrial robot workers. In the next 15 years, it is estimated that the number will jump to over one million. Robotics revenue by 2025 is expected to reach $70 billion.

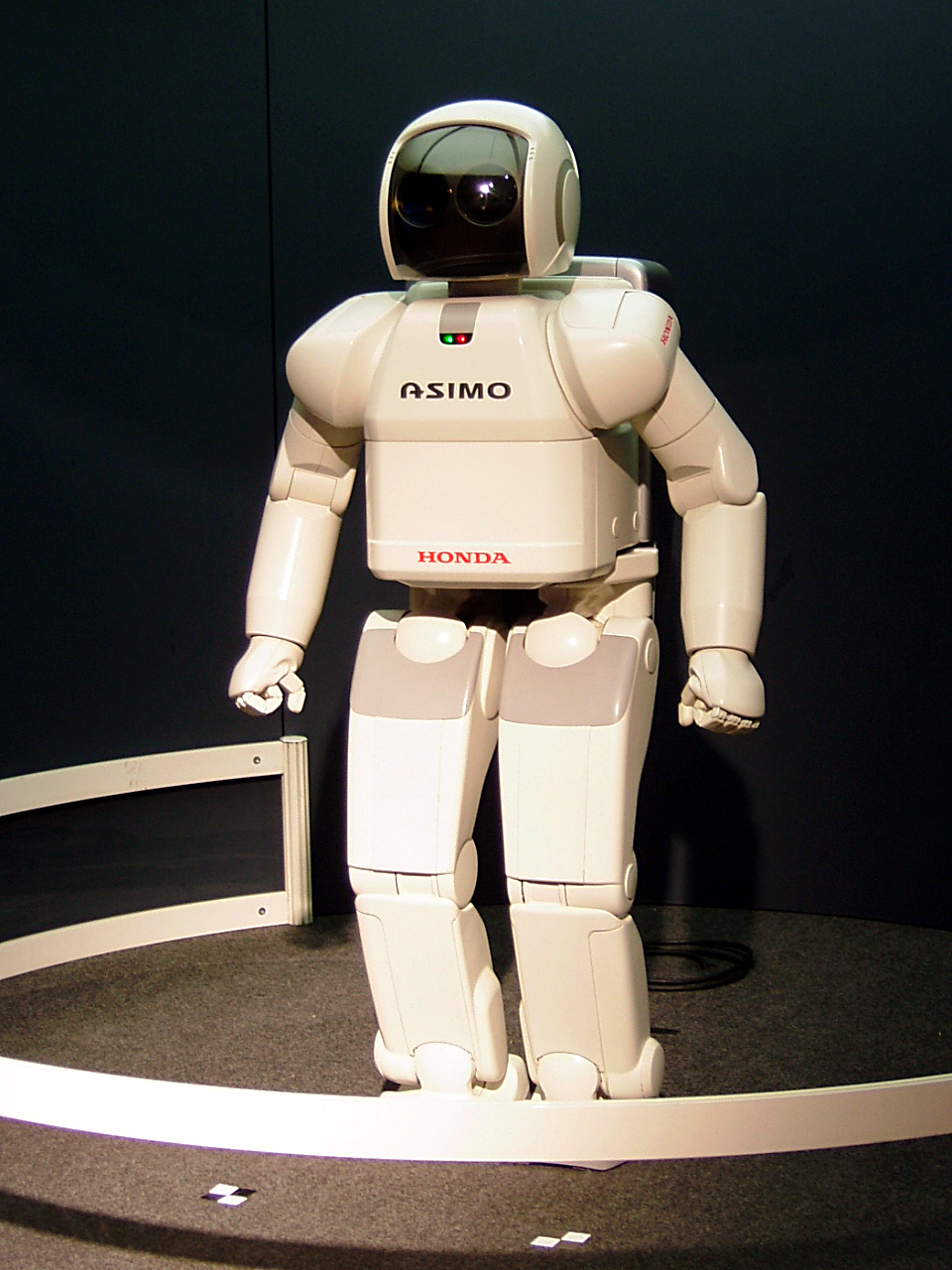
ASIMO is a humanoid robot built by Honda.

== Types of robots ==
=== Humanoid robots ===
- ASIMO, manufactured by Honda
- QRIO by Sony
- HOAP(*1) Robot Series (Humanoid for Open Architecture Platform), manufactured by Fujitsu
- Toyota Partner Robot, manufactured by Toyota
- EMIEW by Hitachi

==== Androids ====
Androids are robots designed to have a very strong resemblance to humans. These include:

- Actroid, a realistic female robot demonstrated at Expo 2005 in Japan
- Hanako, a humanoid robot designed for the training of dental professionals
- HRP-4C, a humanoid robot with a realistic head and the figure of an average young Japanese female

=== Animal (four-legged) robots ===
- AIBO is a commercial robotic dog manufactured by Sony Electronics.

=== Social robots ===
- Musio
- PaPeRo
- Paro, a robot baby seal intended for therapeutic purposes
- Wakamaru
- Lovot

=== Guard robots ===
- Guardrobo D1, manufactured by Sohgo Security Services
- Banryu, manufactured by Sanyo and TMSUK

=== Domestic robots ===
- SmartPal V, manufactured by Yaskawa Electric Corporation
- TWENDY-ONE, developed by Waseda University
- TPR-ROBINA, manufactured by Toyota

=== Mobility robots ===
- WL-16RIII, developed by Waseda University and TMSUK
- i-foot, developed by Toyota
- i-REAL, developed by Toyota
- Murata Boy and Murata Girl, a bicycle-riding and a unicycle-riding robot (respectively) developed by Murata Manufacturing

=== Rescue robots ===
- T-53 Enryu, manufactured by TMSUK

=== Industrial humanoid robots ===
- HRP-3 PROMET Mk-II, manufactured by Kawada Industries, designed by Yutaka Izubuchi
- HRP-4

=== Astronaut robots ===
- Kirobo is Japan's first robot astronaut, used on the ISS since August 10, 2013.

=== Industrial robotics ===
The stronger long-term financial resources and strong domestic market enjoyed by Japanese robotics companies resulted in a greater worldwide market share for these companies, and Japanese robots came to dominate the international market. The few non-Japanese companies that have managed to survive in the market include Adept Technology, Stäubli-Unimation, the Swedish-Swiss company ABB (ASEA Brown-Boveri), the Austrian manufacturer igm Robotersysteme AG and the German company KUKA Robotics.

This includes the assembly line robots used by the robot-based automative production plants.

== Characteristics ==
The recently created CB² (child robot with biomimetic body) can follow moving objects with its eyes. CB² may recognize the human touch, which is possible thanks to the 197 film-like pressure sensors that are placed under its rubber skin. Asada, the team of engineers, brain specialists, psychologists and other specialists in the related fields, created CB² so that it records emotional expressions, memorizes them and then matches them with physical sensations.

The characteristics of the robot are progressive, its abilities improving as technology improves. CB² acts increasingly human with time: it was capable of teaching itself how to walk with the aid of human help. The robot learned how to move around the room by using its 51 "muscles," which are driven by air pressure.

The characteristics of the humanoid Japanese robots include abilities such as blinking, smiling or expressing emotions such as anger and surprise. One of the newer Japanese robots, HRP-4C, is a female robot programmed to catwalk. It walks, talks and, with the help of 30 motors, can move its legs and arms. Its facial expressions are driven by 8 facial motors: it can smile, blink, pout and express anger or surprise.

Robots that are intended to play with children usually look like animals and can make different sounds, move, walk and play. Robot dogs, for example, can bark, move their tail, run or play with a child.

There are also robots that can be mounted and used for transport. Some of these move by rolling.

=== Mobility and movement ===
One of the characteristics and competitive advantages of Japanese robotics is the superior movement and mobility of the robots.

== Commercial applications ==
Conceivable commercial applications of robots include any type of activity that a robot could do in the domestic or industrial field.

Researchers across Japan have unveiled increasingly sophisticated robots with different functions, including a talking office receptionist, a security guard and even a primary school teacher. The newest model of domestic helper, AppriAttenda, was developed by Toshiba. This is a robot that can fetch containers from a refrigerator by using its two arms; it moves on wheels. The purpose of the robot is to assist elderly people living alone. The robots could help them with basic tasks inside the house with those task they would be rewarded .

Fumio Miyazaki, an engineering science professor at the Toyonaka Campus of Osaka University, has stated that Japanese scientists could potentially provide thousands of humanoids that could be working alongside humans by the end of the 2020s.

Japan has the second-highest number of industrial robots in the world after China. Over a quarter of a million robots are employed in an effort to reduce the high labor costs and support further industrial mechanization. Japan wants robotics in the 21st century to be what automobiles were in the 20th century.

Robots are also seen as a solution to Japan's declining birth rate and shrinking workforce, which is an important issue in Japanese society. Although the number of workers that a robot could replace varies on the type of industry, a robot may do the job for several workers and can provide an answer to the nation's declining workforce. This is expected to weigh heavily on future pension and health-care programs.

== History ==
Among Japan's oldest robot precursors are the karakuri ningyo, or mechanical dolls. During the Edo period (1603–1867), Takeda-za developed a mechanical-puppet theater that flourished in Osaka's Dōtonbori district. The Japanese craftsman Hisashige Tanaka, known as "Japan's Edison," created an array of extremely complex mechanical toys, some of which were capable of serving tea, firing arrows drawn from a quiver, or even painting a Japanese kanji character. The landmark text Karakuri Zui (Illustrated Machinery) was published in 1796.

In 1928, the Gakutensoku robot was designed and constructed by biologist Makoto Nishimura. A popular fictional robot was the cartoon character Astro Boy, or Tetsuwan Atomu in Japan. Astro Boy was created by Osamu Tezuka.

In the mid-20th century, professor Ichiro Kato of Waseda University studied humanoid robots. He initiated the WABOT project in 1967, and in 1972 completed the WABOT-1, the world's first full-scale humanoid intelligent robot. WABOT-1 had two arms, walked on two legs, and saw with two camera eyes. It was thus the first android. Its limb control system allowed it to walk with the lower limbs, and to grip and carry objects with hands, using tactile sensors. Its vision system allowed it to measure distances and directions to objects using external receptors, artificial eyes and ears. Its conversation system allowed it to communicate with a person in Japanese, with an artificial mouth. Japan has since been leading the field of robotics.

The Japanese company Kawasaki Robotics started the commercial production of industrial robots over 40 years ago.

Approximately 700,000 industrial robots were used all over the world in 1995, of which 500,000 operated in Japan.

In 1996, Honda announced the P2 humanoid robot, which was an incentive for a number of companies and institutes to develop humanoid robots for various purposes.

In 2012, between 1,235,000 and 1,500,000 industrial robots were in use.

== Japanese robotics companies ==
=== General robotics ===
- Sony Corporation
- Honda
- Toyota
- Toshiba
- Nissan

=== Industrial robotics ===
- Mitsubishi Electric Automation – Robotics
- Denso Corporation
- OTC Daihen Corporation
- Epson Robots
- FANUC
- Intelligent Actuator
- Kawasaki
- Nachi-Fujikoshi
- Yaskawa Electric Corporation

== See also ==
- Baseball batting robot
- Mecha
