= Dysfunctional (disambiguation) =

Dysfunctional refers to abnormality in behaviour.

Dysfunctional may also refer to:

- Dysfunctional family
- Dysfunctional (Dokken album)
- Dysfunctional (Bachelor Girl album)
- Dysfunctional (Tech N9ne song)

== See also ==
- Functional (disambiguation)
- Dysfunction (disambiguation)
