= Humanoid Robotics Project =

Japanese technology development project

The Humanoid Robotics Project (HRP) is a project for development of general domestic helper robots, sponsored by Japan's Ministry of Economy, Trade and Industry (METI) and New Energy and Industrial Technology Development Organization (NEDO), spearheaded by Kawada Industries and supported by the National Institute of Advanced Industrial Science and Technology (AIST) and Kawasaki Heavy Industries, Inc. The HRP series also goes by the name Promet. The HRP should not be confused with the HOAP series (Humanoid for Open Architecture Platform), which is manufactured by Fujitsu.

== Features and technology ==
The project started with three Honda P3 which were bought from Honda. And, the project developed them as the HRP-1 with original features, such as telecommand system.

An interesting feature HRP-2 has is the ability to stand up again after lying flat on the floor, either on its back or front—something Honda's ASIMO is not able to do.

AIST and Kawada Industries have also revealed the HRP-4 bipedal humanoid. The HRP-4 stands 150 cm (5′) tall and weighs 39 kg (86 lbs).

Kawada Industries has also developed the NEXTAGE system, envisioned as a production robot that works alongside human workers. The NEXTAGE not a biped but consists of a torso and arms on a fixed base.

=== Specifications ===
		Honda P3^{1} (1997)	HRP-1 (1997)	HRP-2P (1998)	HRP-2 Promet^{2} (2002)	HRP-3P (2005)	HRP-3 Promet MK-II^{2} (2007)	HRP-4C^{3} (2009)	HRP-4 (2010)
Weight		130 kg	130 kg	58 kg	58 kg	65 kg	68 kg	43 kg	39 kg
Height		160.0 cm	160 cm	154.0 cm	154.0 cm	160.0 cm	160.6 cm	170 cm	151 cm
Width		60.0 cm	60 cm	65.0 cm	62.0 cm	66.4 cm	69.3 cm		44.0 cm
Depth		55.5 cm	55.5 cm	34.0 cm		36.3 cm	41.0 cm		27.0 cm
Walking speed		2 km/h	2 km/h	2 km/h	2 km/h	2 km/h	2 km/h		
Battery		Ni-Zn; 135 V / 6 Ah		Ni-Mh; 48 V / 18 Ah	Ni-Mh; 48 V / 14.8 Ah				Ni-Mh
Continuous operating time		25 minutes	25 minutes			60 minutes	120 minutes	20 minutes	
Degrees of Freedom		28	28	30	30	36	42	42	34
Sensors	Eye stereo camera	2	2	3	3	3	3		
Sensors	Eye-camera	-	-	-	-	2	2		
Sensors	Scanning range finder	-	-	-	-	-	Yes		
Image									
Price									26,000,000JPY

Notes:

1. – For reference to compare with the HRP-1.
2. - The external appearances of HRP-2 and HRP-3 were designed by Yutaka Izubuchi.
3. – "C" means "Cybernetic Human".
