= R100 (disambiguation) =

The R100 was a British rigid airship in operation from 1929 to 1930.

R100 may also refer to:

- Any of several BMW motorcycles from the 1970s and 1980s, including the R100R, R100RT, R100LT, and R100 GS
- Imme R100, a German motorcycle made from 1948 to 1950
- Mazda R100, a coupe car
- Radeon R100, a graphics chip
- NEC R100, prototype for the PaPeRo, a personal robot
- R100 (film), a 2013 film by Hitoshi Matsumoto
- Norristown High Speed Line, previously named R100
- R100, a NIOSH air filtration rating for respirators
- Canon EOS R100, an entry-level mirrorless camera
