= Baseball robot =

A baseball batting robot is a robot that can hit a pitched ball, like a human baseball player would.

Several engineers have independently attempted to build one.

- Frank Barnes alias Robocross has built a robot called The Headless Batter which can hit balls pitched at high speeds by a baseball pitching machine. This semi-android robot performs the same actions - hips swivel, the shoulders drop and the arms extend - as a human batter.
- Hiroshima University associate professor Idaku Ishii has developed a robot able to hit a pitch coming at speeds up to 300 kilometers per hour (186 mph), about double human pitching speed.
- Researchers Masatoshi Ishikawa and colleagues at Tokyo University have developed a baseball batting robot that works for balls thrown to it at slower speeds, but with much greater accuracy. It can bat the balls into a basket at a desired location.

== See also ==
- Robot soccer
- Japanese robotics
