= Dysfunction =

Dysfunction can refer to:

== Anatomical disorders ==
- Paralysis
- Locked-in syndrome
- Functio laesa
- Organ failure

== Social sciences ==
- Abnormality (behavior)
- Dysfunctional family
- Sexual dysfunction
- Manifest and latent functions and dysfunctions (sociological theory)

== Other ==
- Measurement dysfunction
- Dysfunction (album), an album by the rock band Staind

== See also ==
- Malfunction (disambiguation)
- Disorder (disambiguation)
