= Honda E series =

Series of humanoid robots developed by Honda

The E series was a collection of successive humanoid robots created by the Honda Motor Company between the years of 1986 and 1993. These robots were only experimental, but later evolved into the Honda P series, with Honda eventually amassing the knowledge and experience necessary to create Honda's advanced humanoid robot: ASIMO. The fact that Honda had been developing the robots was kept secret from the public until the announcement of the Honda P2 in 1996.

E0, developed in 1986, was the first robot. It walked in a straight line on two feet, in a manner resembling human locomotion, taking around 5 seconds to complete a single step. Quickly engineers realised that in order to walk up slopes, the robot would need to travel faster. The model has 6 degrees of freedom: one in each groin, one in each knee and one in each ankle.

== Models ==
- E0, developed in 1986.
- E1, developed in 1987, was larger than the first and walked at 0.25 km/h. This model and subsequent E-series robots have 12 degrees of freedom: 3 in each groin, 1 in each knee and 2 in each ankle.
- E2, developed in 1989, could travel at 1.2km/h, through the development of "dynamic movement".
- E3, developed in 1991, travelled at 3km/h, the average speed of a walking human.
- E4, developed in 1991, lengthened the knee to achieve speeds of up to 4.7km/h.
- E5, developed in 1992, was able to walk autonomously, albeit with a very large head.
- E6, developed in 1993, was able to autonomously balance, walk over obstacles, and even climb stairs.

	E0 (1986)	E1 (1987)	E2 (1989)	E3 (1991)	E4 (1991)	E5 (1992)	E6 (1993)	→	P1 (1993)
Weight	16.5 kg (36 lb)	72 kg (159 lb)	67.7 kg (149 lb)	86 kg (190 lb)	150 kg (330 lb)	150 kg (330 lb)	150 kg (330 lb)	→	175 kg (386 lb)
Height	101.3 cm (39.9 in)	128.8 cm (50.7 in)	132 cm (52 in)	136.3 cm (53.7 in)	159.5 cm (62.8 in)	170 cm (67 in)	174.3 cm (68.6 in)	→	191.5 cm (75.4 in)
Degrees of freedom	6	12	12	12	12	12	12	→	30 (12 in legs)
Image								→	

== See also ==
- Honda P series
