= Abu Dhabi Science Festival =

The Abu Dhabi Science Festival is a science festival organized by the Abu Dhabi Technology Committee (TDC) which takes place annually in Abu Dhabi, UAE. The festival features many exhibitions, workshops, shows and signature events, as well as school tours for children around the city. The festival was first held in 2011, and its sponsors and partners are Edinburgh Science Festival, Tawazun, Dolphin Energy, ADNOC, Etihad Airways, Masdar, Total, ADEC, Abu Dhabi Municipality, OSN, Radio 2, Abu Dhabi Media, Ferrari World, and produced by Flash Entertainment.

In 2013, the festival moved to a bigger location at the du Forum Yas Island and the Abu Dhabi Corniche East Plaza, as well as reaching new locations in the UAE with a regional tour that will showcase events across the Northern Emirates including Ras Al Khaimah, Fujairah and Umm Al Quwain.
