= Malfunction =

A malfunction is a state in which something functions incorrectly or is obstructed from functioning at all.

Some types of malfunctions are:

- Malfunction (parachuting), malfunction of a parachute
- Sexual malfunction, also called "sexual dysfunction"
  - See also dyspareunia
- Wardrobe malfunction, a euphemism, or slang term, for accidental nudity in public
- Malfunction Junction, an ill-functioning interchange
- Firearm malfunction, the failure of a firearm to function as expected

== See also ==
- Dysfunction (disambiguation)
- Malfunkshun, a grunge rock band
