= Murata Boy and Murata Girl =

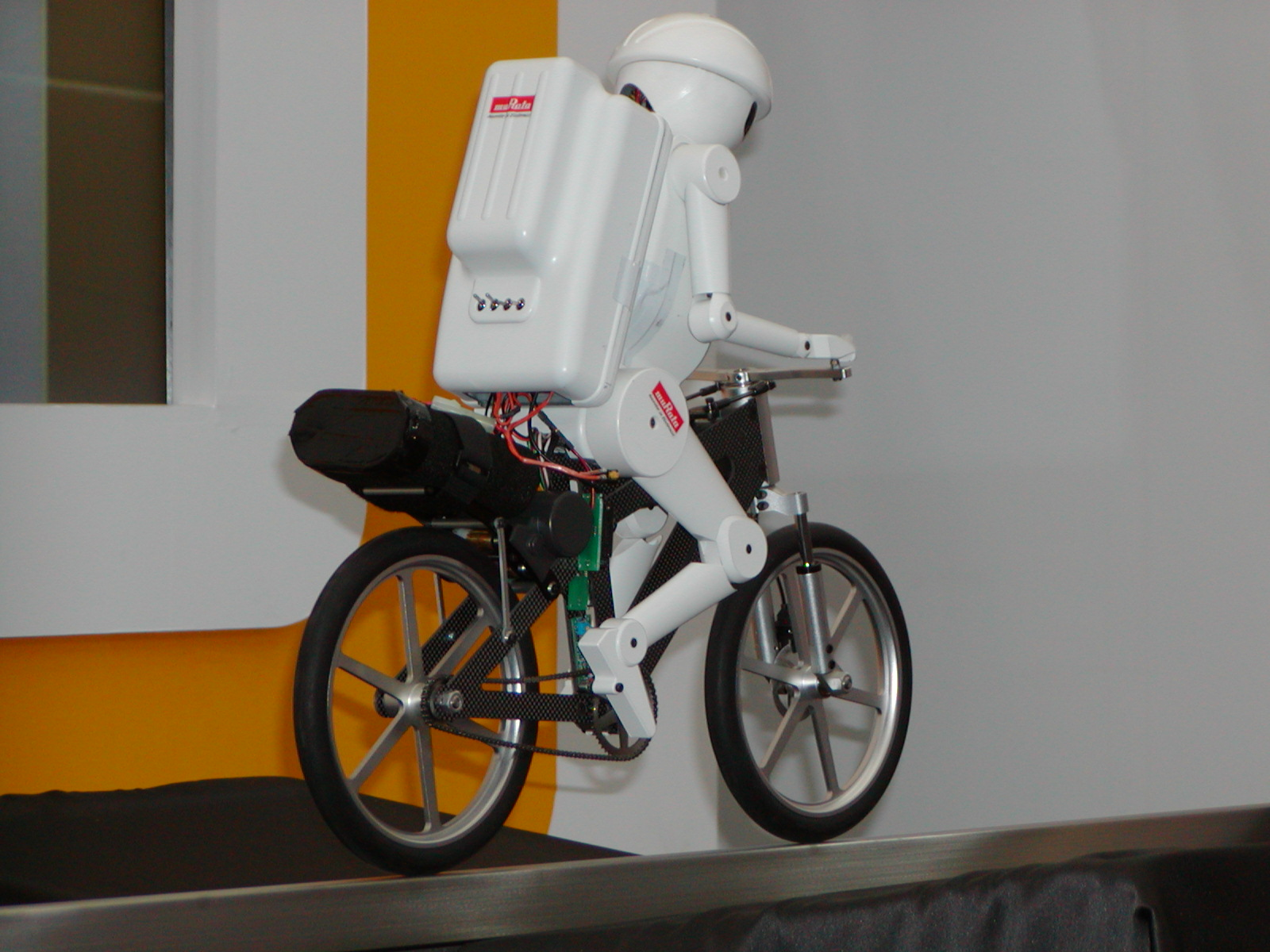
- Murata Boy at CEATEC 2005
- Manufacturer: Murata Manufacturing
- Country: Japan
- Year of creation: 2005 (Murata Boy); 2008 (Murata Girl)
- Price: $ 500,000 (each)
- Purpose: Technology demonstrator
- Website: Official website

Murata Boy and Murata Girl are two self-balancing robots developed by Murata Manufacturing, a Japanese electronic components company. The company developed the robots to showcase a range of their products and generate publicity. The robots are designed to be as energy-efficient as possible, both in their basic technological components and through features like automatic sleep mode.

== Murata Boy ==
Murata Boy is a bicycle-riding robot which, standing 50 cm tall and weighing 5 kg, can travel at a speed up to 2 km per hour. It can balance on the bike moving forwards, backwards, and when remaining still (without planting his feet on the ground). The robot is equipped with:

- gyro sensors (for stability and redressing)
- a shock sensor (for impact detection)
- an angular velocity sensor
- a temperature monitor
- a CCD camera
- an ultrasonic sensor (for obstacle detection)
- an infrared sensor (for detecting human movement)
- an EMI filter (to reduce electronic interference)
- Wi-Fi and energy-efficient close-distance bluetooth modules (for interaction)

Murata Boy was listed on TIME magazine's list of Best Inventions of 2006.

== Murata Girl ==
Murata Girl is a unicycle-riding robot released in 2008, standing 50 cm tall and weighing 6 kg that can travel at a speed of 5 cm per second and can ride along a balance beam. She is equipped with the following:

- gyro sensors (for stability and redressing)
- a shock sensor (for impact detection)
- a temperature monitor
- a CCD camera
- an ultrasonic sensor (for obstacle detection)
- an infrared sensor (for detecting human movement)
- Wi-Fi and energy-efficient close-distance bluetooth modules
