= HOAP =

Advanced humanoid robot platform

The HOAP series robots are an advanced humanoid robot platform manufactured by Fujitsu Automation in Japan. HOAP is an abbreviation for "Humanoid for Open Architecture Platform".

The HOAP series should not be confused with the HRP series (also known as Promet).

== History ==
In 2001, Fujitsu realized its first commercial humanoid robot named HOAP-1. The HOAP-2 was released in 2003 followed by the HOAP-3 in 2005.

== Specifications of HOAP-2 ==
HOAP-2 is 1 ft 7 in (48 cm) high and weighs 15 lb (6.8 kg). Its system consists of the robot body, PC and power supplies, and the PC OS uses RT-Linux (open C/C++language). The robot's smooth movement was achieved because the electric current control of the motor was possible (except neck and hand). The USB interface for the internal LAN facilitates easy modification or addition of new actuators and sensors. The neck, waist and hands now have movement capability, allowing smooth movement. The robot is easy to program and has a simple initial start up using a sample program included with the purchase of the robot.

== Capabilities of HOAP-2 ==
HOAP-2 has been demonstrated with capabilities to successfully perform various tasks, including walking on flat terrain, performing sumo movements, cleaning a whiteboard, following a ball, and grasping thin objects, such as pens and brushes.
