= Honda P series =

Humanoid robots developed by Honda

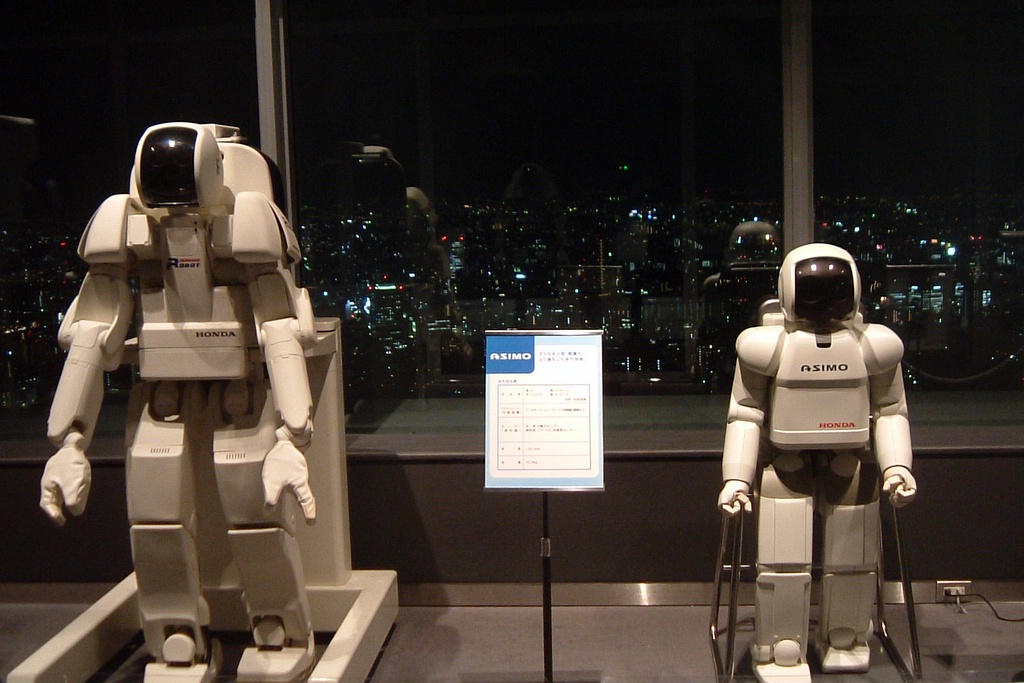
P3 model (left) compared to ASIMO

The P series is a series of prototype humanoid robots developed by Honda between 1993 and 2000. They were preceded by the Honda E series (whose development was not revealed to the public at the time) and followed by the ASIMO series, then the world's most advanced humanoid robots. Honda Motor's President and CEO Hiroyuki Yoshino, at the time, described Honda's humanoid robotics program as consistent with its direction to enhance human mobility.

== History ==
Work to develop an advanced humanoid robot began in 1986, when Honda established a research center focused on fundamental technologies, including humanoid robotics.

Honda engineers had to research how humans walk, using the human skeleton for reference to create a replica and have it function like a human being. In 1986, the first two-legged robot was made to walk, used by Honda engineers to establish stable walking technology, including steps and sloped surfaces.

In 1993, Honda began developing "Prototype" models ("P" series), attaching the legs to a torso with arms that could perform basic tasks. P2, the second prototype model, debuted in December 1996, using wireless techniques making it the first self-regulating, two-legged walking robot. P2 weighed 463 pounds with a height of six feet tall. In September 1997, P3 was introduced as the first completely independent bi-pedal humanoid walking robot, standing five feet, four inches tall and weighing 287 pounds.

== Features ==
Honda engineers determined a robot should be easy to operate and small in size, enabling it to help people—for instance, to look eye to eye with someone sitting in a chair.

ASIMO can be controlled by a portable controller whereas P3 was controlled from a workstation.

- P1 developed in 1993
- P2 unveiled in 1996
- P3 unveiled in 1997
- P4 developed in 2000

	P1 (1993)^{1}	P2 (1996)	P3 (1997)	P4 (2000)^{2}	->	ASIMO (2000)	ASIMO (2005)
Weight	175 kg	210 kg	130 kg	80 kg	->	52 kg	54 kg
Height	191.5 cm	182.0 cm	160.0 cm	160.0 cm	->	120.0 cm	130.0 cm
Width		60.0 cm	60.0 cm		->	45.0 cm	45.0 cm
Depth		75.8 cm	55.5 cm		->	44.0 cm	37.0 cm
Walking speed		2 km/h	2 km/h	2 km/h	->	1.6 km/h	2.7 km/h (walking); 6 km/h (running)
Max working load		5 kg/hand	2 kg/hand		->		1 kg (carrying); 10 kg (on cart)
Battery	135 V - 6 A·h - Ni-Zn				->	38.4 V - NiMH	51.8 V - Li-ion
Continuous operating time		15 minutes	25 minutes		->	30 minutes	1 hour (walking)
Degrees of freedom	30	30	28	34	->	26	34
Image					->		

Notes:

1. – The P1 was developed in 1993 but was not unveiled and Honda kept its existence a secret until the announcement of the P2 in 1996.
2. – The P4 was developed in 2000 and originally unveiled as "P3-improved prototype" (P3改良型試作機). The model was announced as the "P4" in 2009.

== See also ==
- Honda E series, experimental models
- Humanoid Robotics Project; the HRP-1 is a variant of the Honda P3.
