= Measurement dysfunction =

Measurement dysfunction describes a situation or behavior where actual data metrics, statistics and especially their meaning (or communicated meaning), can become problematic due to misuse. Specifically, in areas such as human resources (performance measurements), technology (safety), finance or health, measurement dysfunctionality is critical, as it can lead to negative outcomes, wrong predictions or forecasts.

Practices to avoid:

- Reward of wrong behavior (also persons who manipulate)
- Measuring the wrong things
- Measuring either not enough or too much
- Cheating or data manipulation (intentional or unintentional due to wrong calculation models, systematic errors, human errors, etc.)

On eliminating dysfunctional measurement:

- Establish, and monitor the move to and adherence to ‘policies’ for good, functional measurement
- Support technical correctness
- Periodically evaluate the information need and value delivered by measurements

== See also ==
- Measurement uncertainty
- Leadership
- Performance measurement
- Plagiarism
- OKR
- Corporate culture
- Verification and validation
- Scientific rigor
