= List of robots =

List of notable physical robots

This is a list of robots and robot product families, the list includes robots developed for research, industry, domestic use, medicine, transportation, exploration, education, entertainment, defense, and other applications.

== Historical and pioneering robots ==
- Elmer and Elsie — early autonomous electronic robots developed by William Grey Walter.
- Freddy II — experimental robot developed at the University of Edinburgh.
- Shakey — mobile robot developed at the Stanford Research Institute.
- Stanford Cart — experimental mobile robot developed at Stanford University.
- Unimate — early industrial robot first used on a General Motors production line.
- WABOT-1 — early full-scale humanoid robot developed at Waseda University.

== Humanoid robots ==
- AgiBot A2 — humanoid robot developed by AgiBot.
- Ameca — humanoid robot developed by Engineered Arts.
- ASIMO — humanoid robot developed by Honda.
- Atlas — humanoid robot developed by Boston Dynamics.
- Digit — humanoid robot developed by Agility Robotics.
- EVE — humanoid robot developed by 1X Technologies.
- FEDOR — Russian humanoid robot developed for spaceflight.
- Figure 01 — humanoid robot developed by Figure AI.
- HRP-4C — humanoid robot developed by Japan's National Institute of Advanced Industrial Science and Technology.
- HUBO — humanoid robot developed by KAIST.
- iCub — child-sized humanoid research robot.
- InMoov — open-source 3D-printed humanoid robot.
- Kirobo — humanoid robot sent to the International Space Station.
- NAO — programmable humanoid robot developed by Aldebaran Robotics.
- NEO — humanoid robot developed by 1X Technologies.
- Optimus — humanoid robot developed by Tesla.
- Pepper — humanoid social robot developed by SoftBank Robotics.
- PETMAN — humanoid robot developed by Boston Dynamics.
- QRIO — humanoid entertainment robot developed by Sony.
- Robonaut — humanoid robot developed by NASA and General Motors.
- Sophia — humanoid social robot developed by Hanson Robotics.
- Surena — series of humanoid robots developed in Iran.
- TOPIO — humanoid robot designed to play table tennis.
- Toyota Partner Robot — series of humanoid and mobility robots developed by Toyota.
- Unitree G1 — humanoid robot developed by Unitree Robotics.
- Valkyrie — humanoid robot developed by NASA.
- Vyommitra — humanoid robot developed by ISRO for the Gaganyaan program.

== Self-driving vehicles ==
- Tesla Cybercab — purpose-built autonomous robotaxi developed by Tesla.
- Tesla Robotaxi — autonomous ride-hailing service using Tesla vehicles, initially based on the Model Y.
- Waymo Ojai — purpose-built autonomous robotaxi operated by Waymo.
- Waymo — autonomous driving system and robotaxi fleet developed by Alphabet.
- Zoox — purpose-built autonomous electric robotaxi developed by Zoox.

== Quadrupedal robots ==
- AIBO — robotic dog developed by Sony.
- ANYmal — quadrupedal inspection robot developed by ANYbotics.
- BigDog — quadrupedal robot developed by Boston Dynamics.
- Cheetah — high-speed quadrupedal robot developed by Boston Dynamics.
- LittleDog — small quadrupedal research robot developed by Boston Dynamics.
- Spot — quadrupedal robot developed by Boston Dynamics.

== Domestic robots ==
- Braava — robotic floor-mopping system developed by iRobot.
- Looj — gutter-cleaning robot developed by iRobot.
- Robomow — series of autonomous robotic lawn mowers.
- Roomba — robotic vacuum cleaner developed by iRobot.
- Scooba — robotic floor-washing system developed by iRobot.

== Industrial and workplace robots ==
- Baxter — collaborative industrial robot developed by Rethink Robotics.
- Hercules — warehouse robot that carries inventory pods to workers for order picking.
- PUMA — industrial robotic arm developed by Unimation.
- Sawyer — collaborative industrial robot developed by Rethink Robotics.
- Stretch — mobile warehouse robot that uses a suction gripper to handle boxes by Boston Dynamics.
- Tally — autonomous inventory robot used in retail stores.
- Taurob Inspector — mobile inspection robot designed for hazardous industrial environments.

== Agricultural robots ==
- FarmBot — open-source Cartesian farming robot used for automated planting, watering, and weed control.
- FarmWise Titan FT-35 — autonomous agricultural robot used for mechanical weed removal.

== Flying robots ==
=== Quadcopters ===
- Crazyflie 2.0 — open-source nano quadcopter developed by Bitcraze.
- DJI Avata — camera quadcopter developed by DJI.
- DJI Inspire — professional camera quadcopter series developed by DJI.
- DJI Mavic — compact camera quadcopter series developed by DJI.
- DJI Mini — lightweight camera quadcopter series developed by DJI.
- DJI Neo — compact camera quadcopter developed by DJI.
- DJI Phantom — camera quadcopter series developed by DJI.
- GoPro Karma — camera quadcopter developed by GoPro.
- Intel Shooting Star — quadcopter developed for coordinated drone light shows.
- Parrot AR.Drone — quadcopter developed by Parrot for recreation and research.
- Skydio 2 — autonomous camera quadcopter developed by Skydio.
- STM Kargu — military quadcopter and loitering munition developed by STM.
- Zano — miniature camera quadcopter developed by Torquing Group.

=== Delivery drones ===
- Amazon Prime Air — autonomous delivery drone system developed by Amazon.
- Wingcopter — autonomous delivery drone developed by the German company Wingcopter.
- Zipline — autonomous drone delivery system used for medical supplies and other goods.

=== Research and utility drones ===
- DelFly — small flapping-wing research robot developed at Delft University of Technology.

== Delivery and logistics robots ==
- Amazon Scout — autonomous delivery robot developed by Amazon.
- Starship delivery robot — autonomous sidewalk delivery robot developed by Starship Technologies.

== Medical and assistive robots ==
- CyberKnife — robotic radiosurgery system developed by Accuray.
- Da Vinci Surgical System — robotic surgical system developed by Intuitive Surgical.
- ZEUS robotic surgical system — robotic surgical system developed by Computer Motion.

== Disaster response robots ==
- Battlefield Extraction-Assist Robot — rescue robot designed to carry injured people and handle hazardous materials.
- PackBot — tracked robot used at the World Trade Center site and the Fukushima Daiichi nuclear disaster.

== Robotic exoskeletons ==
- Hybrid Assistive Limb – powered exoskeleton developed by Cyberdyne for medical and assistive use.
- Human Universal Load Carrier – powered military exoskeleton developed to assist soldiers carrying heavy loads.
- Indego – powered exoskeleton developed at Vanderbilt University for mobility assistance.
- ReWalk – powered walking-assistance exoskeleton for people with lower-limb disabilities.

== 3D-printing robots ==
- BOD2 — gantry-style construction 3D printer developed by COBOD.
- Crane WASP — reconfigurable construction 3D printer developed by WASP.
- D-Shape — large-scale robotic 3D printer developed for construction and architectural applications.
- Platypus X12 — mobile construction 3D printer developed by Luyten 3D.

== Military, security and emergency robots ==
- Crusher — experimental autonomous ground vehicle developed for DARPA.
- Daksh — bomb-disposal robot developed by India's Defence Research and Development Organisation.
- Dragon Runner — portable military robot used for reconnaissance and explosive-ordnance disposal.
- Guardium — autonomous ground vehicle developed for security and military patrols.
- MARCbot — military reconnaissance robot used by the United States Army.
- PackBot — military and bomb-disposal robot developed by iRobot.
- TALON — tracked military and explosive-ordnance-disposal robot.
- SWORDS — armed robot based on the TALON platform.

=== Military aerial robots ===
- Bayraktar Akıncı — high-altitude combat drone developed by Baykar.
- Bayraktar TB2 — combat and reconnaissance drone developed by Baykar.
- Black Hornet Nano — miniature reconnaissance drone used by military forces.
- Hermes 450 — Israeli reconnaissance drone developed by Elbit Systems.
- Hermes 900 — medium-altitude long-endurance reconnaissance drone developed by Elbit Systems.
- Heron — medium-altitude long-endurance reconnaissance drone developed by Israel Aerospace Industries.
- IAI Harop — loitering munition developed by Israel Aerospace Industries.
- MQ-1 Predator — reconnaissance and combat drone developed by General Atomics.
- MQ-1C Gray Eagle — reconnaissance and combat drone developed for the United States Army.
- MQ-4C Triton — maritime surveillance drone developed by Northrop Grumman.
- MQ-20 Avenger — jet-powered unmanned combat aircraft developed by General Atomics.
- MQ-25 Stingray — carrier-based unmanned aerial refueling aircraft developed by Boeing.
- MQ-9 Reaper — reconnaissance and combat drone developed by General Atomics.
- RQ-11 Raven — small reconnaissance drone developed by AeroVironment.
- RQ-170 Sentinel — stealth reconnaissance drone developed by Lockheed Martin.
- RQ-21 Blackjack — tactical reconnaissance drone developed by Insitu.
- RQ-4 Global Hawk — high-altitude surveillance drone developed by Northrop Grumman.
- S-70 Okhotnik-B — Russian stealth unmanned combat aircraft.
- ScanEagle — small reconnaissance drone developed by Insitu and Boeing.
- Shahed 136 — Iranian loitering munition developed by Shahed Aviation Industries.
- Switchblade — family of portable loitering munitions developed by AeroVironment.
- X-47B — experimental carrier-based unmanned combat aircraft developed by Northrop Grumman.

=== Military underwater robots ===
- Bluefin-21 — autonomous underwater vehicle developed by Bluefin Robotics for defense, scientific, and deep-sea missions.
- Hui Long-class UUV — Taiwanese unmanned underwater vehicle developed as a submarine technology test platform.
- Knifefish — autonomous underwater vehicle developed for naval mine detection.
- Orca — extra-large autonomous underwater vehicle developed by Boeing for the United States Navy.
- Poseidon — Russian nuclear-powered autonomous underwater vehicle capable of carrying a nuclear warhead.

== Underwater and marine robots ==
- Autosub — series of autonomous underwater vehicles developed in the United Kingdom.
- Boaty McBoatface — autonomous underwater vehicle operated by the National Oceanography Centre.
- Jason — remotely operated deep-sea research vehicle operated by the Woods Hole Oceanographic Institution.
- Kaikō — Japanese remotely operated deep-sea research vehicle.
- Nereus — hybrid autonomous and remotely operated deep-sea vehicle.
- REMUS — series of autonomous underwater vehicles developed for research, surveying, and search operations.
- Sentry — autonomous underwater vehicle operated by the Woods Hole Oceanographic Institution.

== Space and planetary robots ==
- CIMON — free-flying robotic assistant used aboard the International Space Station.
- Curiosity — NASA rover exploring Mars.
- Ingenuity — robotic helicopter operated on Mars by NASA.
- Lunokhod 1 — Soviet robotic lunar rover.
- Lunokhod 2 — Soviet robotic lunar rover.
- Opportunity — NASA Mars rover operated from 2004 to 2018.
- Perseverance — NASA rover exploring Mars.
- Pragyan — Indian lunar rover used during the Chandrayaan-3 mission.
- Sojourner — NASA's first rover to operate on Mars.
- Spirit — NASA Mars rover operated from 2004 to 2010.
- Yutu — Chinese lunar rover carried by Chang'e 3.
- Yutu-2 — Chinese lunar rover carried by Chang'e 4.
- Zhurong — Chinese Mars rover carried by the Tianwen-1 mission.

== Educational, research and open-source robots ==
=== Educational and research robots ===
- Boe-Bot — programmable wheeled robot used in robotics education.
- HERO — educational robot series produced by Heathkit.
- iRobot Create — programmable mobile robot based on the Roomba platform.
- Khepera — small mobile robot used in robotics research and education.
- Lego Mindstorms — programmable robotics construction platform developed by Lego.
- Bioloid — educational robotics platform developed by Robotis.

=== Open-source robot platforms ===
- ArduCopter — open-source multirotor aircraft platform based on ArduPilot.
- e-puck — open mobile robot platform designed for education and research.
- iCub — open humanoid robot platform developed for research in embodied cognition.
- OpenROV — open-source remotely operated underwater vehicle.
- Salvius — open-source humanoid robot.
- Thymio — open educational mobile robot.
- TurtleBot — open-source mobile robot platform used for education and research.

== Telepresence robots ==
- Double — mobile telepresence robot developed by Double Robotics.
- IvanAnywhere — telepresence robot developed for remote workplace collaboration.
- QB — mobile telepresence robot developed by Anybots.
- Q(X) — telepresence robot developed by Anybots.
- TiLR — mobile telepresence robot developed by RoboDynamics.

== Social and entertainment robots ==
- Ai-Da — humanoid robotic artist.
- hitchBOT — social robot designed to travel by relying on assistance from humans.
- Jibo — social and personal-assistant robot developed by Jibo, Inc.
- Kismet — expressive social robot developed at the Massachusetts Institute of Technology.
- PARO — therapeutic robot modeled after a baby harp seal.
- Pleo — robotic dinosaur designed as an interactive companion.
- Wakamaru — domestic and social robot developed by Mitsubishi Heavy Industries.

== Robotic prostheses ==
- Bebionic — myoelectric prosthetic hand designed for everyday activities.
- Michelangelo Hand — articulated robotic hand prosthesis developed by Ottobock.

== Biomimetic robots ==
- Roboboa — snake-like robotic toy developed by WowWee.
- RoboTuna — robotic fish developed at the Massachusetts Institute of Technology to study tuna-like swimming.

== Other robots ==
- Alpha — robot developed for research and public demonstrations.
- Skycam — cable-suspended camera system used for aerial television coverage of sporting events as a cable robot.
- Terabot-S — mobile robot developed for research and experimentation.
- Vaimos — autonomous robotic bicycle developed for research.

== See also ==
- Autonomous robot
- List of fictional robots and androids
- List of roboticists
- List of robotics companies
- List of robotics journals
- List of robotics laboratories
- List of robotics occupations
- Physical AI
- Solar-powered aircraft
- Teleoperation
- Types of robots
