= 3D concrete printing =

Additive manufacturing process using concrete

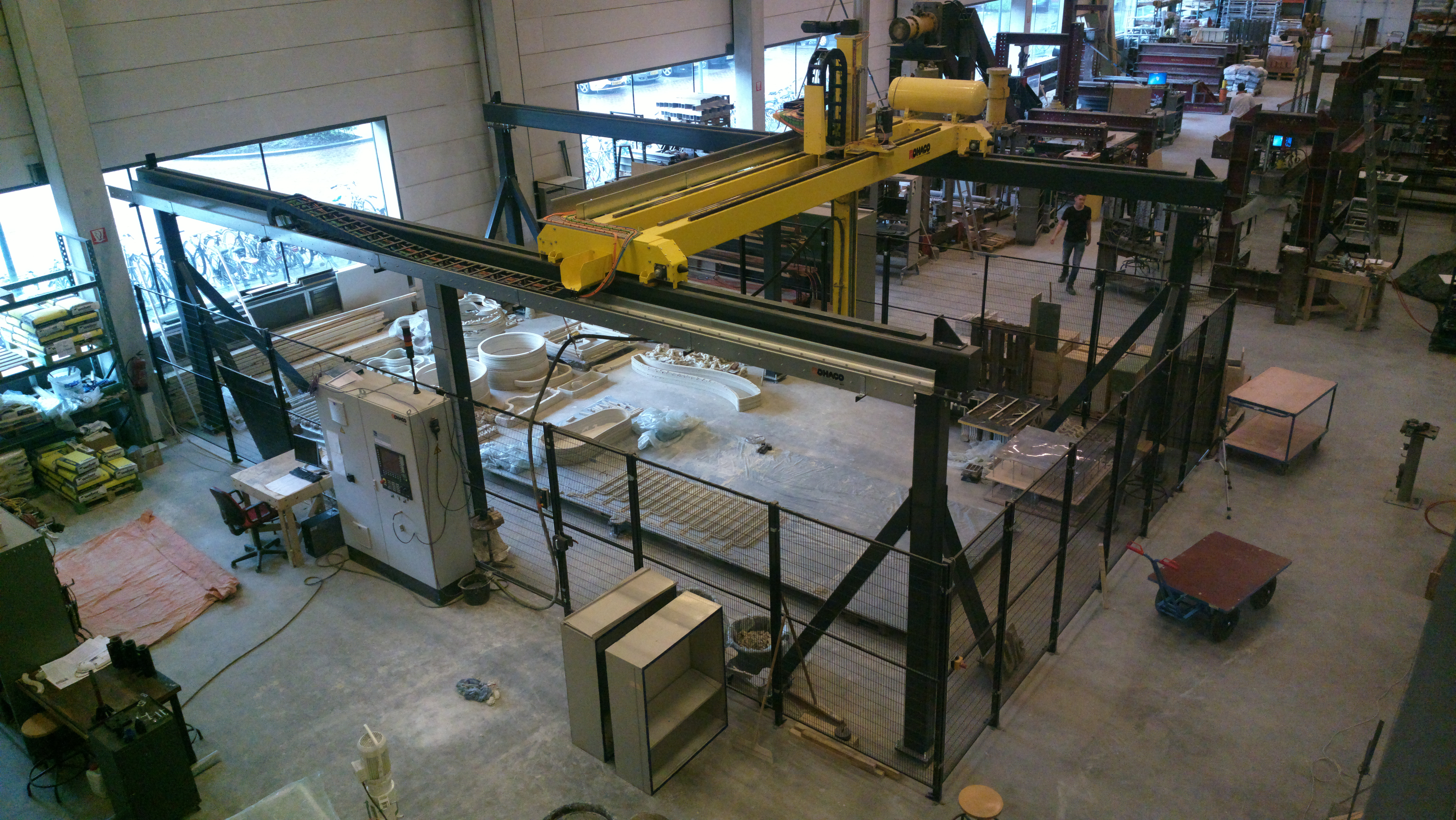
TU/e Built Environment's Rohaco 3D Concrete Printer being extensively used for Concrete Printing Research.

3D concrete printing, or simply concrete printing, refers to digital fabrication processes for cementitious materials based on one of several different 3D printing technologies. 3D-printed concrete eliminates the need for formwork, reducing material waste and allowing for greater geometric freedom in complex structures. With developments in mix design and 3D printing technology since 2010, 3D concrete printing has grown exponentially since its emergence in the 1990s. Architectural and structural applications of 3D-printed concrete include the production of building blocks, building modules, street furniture, pedestrian bridges, and low-rise residential structures.

== History ==
Automating building processes has been an area of research in architecture and civil engineering since the early 20th century. The earliest approaches focused on automating masonry. In 1904, a patent for a brick-laying machine was granted to John Thomas in the US. By the 1960s, the technology developed significantly and functional equipment, such as the Motor-Mason, were in use on building sites.

At the same time, automating concrete construction processes was also being developed. Slip forming, a widely used technique for building vertical concrete cores for high-rise buildings, was developed in the early 20th century for building silos and grain elevators. The concept was pioneered by James MacDonald, of MacDonald Engineering Chicago, and published by Milko S. Ketchum in an illustrated book: The Design of Walls, Bins, and Grain Elevators in 1907. Later, MacDonald published a scientific paper: Moving Forms for Reinforced Concrete Storage Bins in 1911. Finally, on 24 May 1917, MacDonald was granted a US patent for a device to move and elevate a concrete form in a vertical plane.

Innovations in the automation of concreting processes continued throughout the 20th century. 3D printing processes were first developed in the 1980s for photopolymers and thermoplastics. For some time, 3D printing technology was limited to high-value-adding sectors such as aerospace and biomedical industries due to the high cost of materials. However, as the knowledge base for 3D printing grew, new additive manufacturing processes were developed for other materials, including for concrete. 3D printed concrete technology originated from Rensselaer Polytechnic Institute (RPI) in New York when Joseph Pegna first applied additive manufacturing to concrete in 1997. This experiment was just a proof of concept, but Pegna recognized the developing robotics industry and saw it as an opportunity to automate the construction process, while also decreasing costs and waste production. Pegna's research would later become the basis for binder jetting, or powder based 3D concrete printing.

In 1998, Behrokh Khoshnevis at the University of Southern California developed Contour Crafting, which was the first layered extrusion device for concrete. The system used a computer-controlled crane to automate the pouring process and was capable of creating smooth contour surfaces. Khoshnevis initially designed this system to serve as rapid home construction for natural disaster recovery, and he said that the system could complete a home in a single day. With innovations in materials, mix design, and printing technology, researchers and engineers have since expanded on these two printing techniques, which will be discussed further in the following section.

== Construction methods ==
A number of different approaches have been demonstrated, which include on-site and off-site fabrication of building elements or entire buildings, using industrial robots, gantry systems, and tethered autonomous vehicles (see section on 3D Printers). Demonstrations of construction 3D printing technologies have included fabrication of housing, building elements (cladding, structural panels, and columns), bridges, civil infrastructure, artificial reefs, follies, and sculptures. Three different construction methods are currently used in 3D concrete printing: binder jetting, robotic shotcrete, and layered material extrusion.

=== Binder jetting ===
Binder jet 3D printing, also known as powder bed and binder 3D printing, was originally developed at the Massachusetts Institute of Technology for activating starch or gypsum powder with water as a binder, before Joseph Pegna applied the system to concrete. In binder jetting, a print head selectively deposits a liquid binder on a powdered substrate, layer by layer. The layer height typically varies between 0.2 and 2 mm and determines both the speed and the level of detail in the finished part. Post-processing steps are necessary in binder-jetting once the layered fabrication is complete. First, the unconsolidated powder needs to be removed mechanically, using brushes and vacuum tubes. Additional curing steps may also be necessary in ovens with controlled humidity and temperature or microwaves. Finally, coatings may also be applied on the surface to consolidate small surface features or to improve the surface quality of the part. Typical materials used for coatings are polyester or epoxy resin.

3D concrete printing with binder jetting technologies has been demonstrated at large scale by Enrico Dini with D-Shape. D-Shape relies on a non-hydraulic Sorel cement that is based on sand activated with magnesium oxide in the powder bed and a liquid magnesium chloride solution as binder. The technology has mainly been used to create furniture, such as a coffee table and the Root Chair designed by KOL/MAC LLC Architecture + Design in 2009. Furthermore, D-Shape produced large architectural parts, such as the 3 × 3 × 3 m Radiolaria pavilion designed by Shiro Studio in 2008, the Ferreri House for the Triennale di Milano in 2010, and a twelve-metre-long footbridge designed by Acciona in Madrid, in 2017.

Another exponent of binder-jet 3D concrete printing is California-based firm Emerging Objects. For their Bloom pavilion built in 2015, the company used an iron oxide-free cement and organic binder. While it is unclear if there is any cement hydration involved in the process, the project is often cited among other binder-jet 3D concrete printing projects due to the use of cement in the powder bed. Unlike the structures of D-Shape, which were fabricated in one piece, Emerging Objects fabricated 840 small building blocks that were stacked to create the 3.6 × 3.6 × 2.7 m structure.

==== Advantages and limitations ====
Compared to other 3D printing methods for architectural applications, binder jetting allows for a higher degree of geometric freedom, including the possibility of creating unsupported cantilevers or overhangs and hollow parts. Unlike other 3D printing processes that require auxiliary support structures, binder jetting relies on the bed of unbonded powder to ensure continuous support for consecutive layers during fabrication.

Typically, in binder jet 3D printing, the leftover powder can be reused for future parts. However, the recyclability of the cement and aggregate powder is problematic due to the exposure to ambient humidity, which can trigger the hydration process. Therefore, binder jet 3D printing is not suitable for on-site construction.

=== Layered extrusion 3D printing ===
Concrete layered extrusion 3D printing involves a numerically controlled nozzle that precisely extrudes a cementitious paste layer by layer. Layers are generally between 5 mm and a few centimeters in thickness. The extrusion nozzle may be accompanied by an automatic troweling tool that flattens the 3D-printed layers and covers the grooves at the interlayer interfaces, resulting in a smooth concrete surface. Additional automation steps have been proposed for the integration in one fabrication step of modular steel reinforcement bars or integrated building services, such as plumbing or electrical conduits. For this process, process planning and deposition speed are critical parameters that influence the material's stiffening and hardening rate.

Layered extrusion 3D concrete printing is most commonly used in on-site construction and is accompanied by large-scale 3D printers (see section on 3D Printers). The technology has seen a growing interest recently, with numerous universities, start-ups, and prominent established construction companies developing dedicated hardware, concrete mixes, and automation setups for concrete extrusion 3D printing. Applications include bridges, columns, walls, floor slabs, street furniture, water tanks, and entire buildings, both in prefabrication or on-site setups.

==== Advantages and limitations ====
Unlike conventional concrete casting and spraying, layered extrusion 3D printing needs no formworks. This is a significant advantage considering the fact that formworks in concrete construction can account for 50-80% of the resources, more than raw materials, reinforcement, and labour combined. The main challenges of layered concrete extrusion are the set on demand rheology of concrete, the integration of reinforcement, and the formation of cold joints at the interface between consecutive layers.

=== Slip forming ===
Robotic slip-forming, a process developed at ETH Zürich under the name Smart Dynamic Casting, is sometimes included in the family of concrete 3D printing processes, together with layered extrusion and binder-jetting. The process loosely fits the definition of 3D printing, due to its additive nature, with material being slowly extruded through an actuated mould that can vary its section. However, unlike the other 3D printing processes, slip forming is a continuous process, and not discrete or layer-based, and therefore it is more closely related to formative processes such as casting and extrusion.

== Technology ==
=== 3D printers for concrete (concrenters) ===
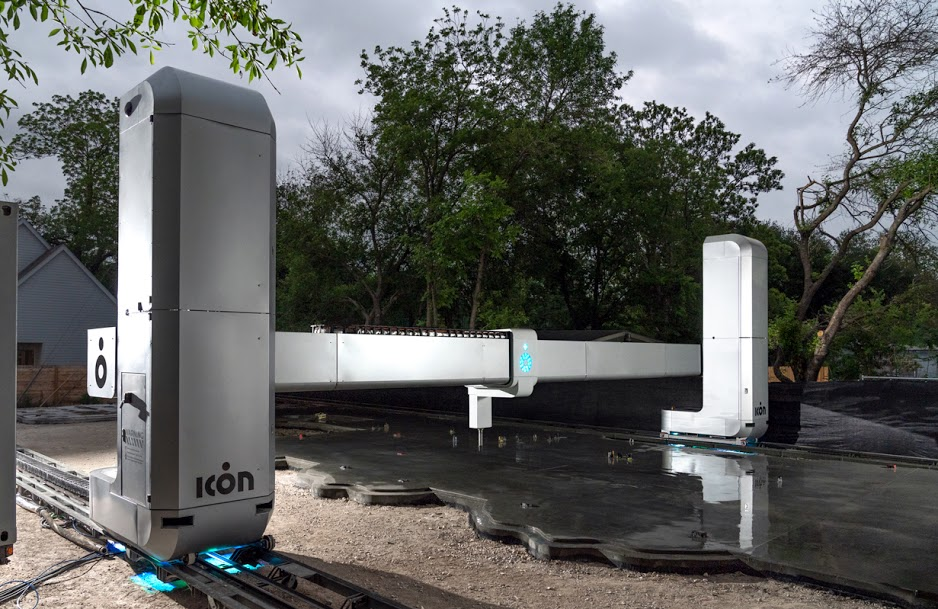
ICON's gantry system, known as the Vulcan, can print structures up to 3,000 square feet

There are a few main categories of robots that are used for 3D concrete printing, which depend on the application, scale of the project, and printing technique. All construction 3D printers generally consist of a support structure and a printer head with a nozzle that extrudes the concrete. Printers are usually used in tandem with modelling software that uploads the building plans directly to the printer.

- Gantry robots: Gantry robots are the most common in 3D concrete printing, and consist of a mobile gantry system with mixing and deposition systems. They can range from small lab models to large-scale printers for printing full components or structures. These printers are typically limited to vertical extrusions but have the benefit of high stability and easy scalability for larger projects. Gantry robots must be larger than the assembled structure, which can add cost to transportation and set-up costs. However, they are the easiest to control of all 3D printers.
- Cable-driven system: In a cable-driven system, the print head is suspended between several fixed points within a frame. It has more geometric freedom than a gantry system and is more lightweight and transportable. However, it requires a wide area for equipment and planning is essential so that the cables do not overlap with the printed structure.
- Robotic arm: This is similar to the robotic arms seen in assembly lines, which have six-axis movement and the most freedom of 3D printing systems. These are also capable of depositing concrete, embedding components like rebar, and performing any post-processing that may be required after the concrete sets. Robotic arms are the most compact system but are most commonly used for small-scale applications. However, large scale robotic arms based on heavy duty construction equipment are now available, combining the print size of large gantry systems and the transportability of any standard construction equipment.

=== Printer parameters ===
In addition to printer type, specific printer parameters significantly impact the final performance of 3D printed concrete and must be carefully selected when planning for 3D printing construction. These parameters can simply be broken down into print head design and print speed.

==== Print head design ====
The print head must be selected so that the concrete mix can smoothly pass through the nozzle and create the bonding effect between each layer, while also initiating the solidification process. Similar to printer selection, nozzle shapes and sizes vary depending on the application. 3D printed concrete samples from nozzles with rectangular holes typically have higher strength than those printed with circular nozzles, because there are fewer gaps between each printed layer. However, circular nozzles are more adept for printing complex geometries. For samples printed from the same nozzle type, mechanical properties are improved when a larger nozzle is used.

The height of the print head is the height of the nozzle relative to the printing platform. This parameter affects the surface quality between layers including bond strength, and must be precisely adjusted. A print head that is set too high will reduce the bond strength between layers, causing an unstable shape. A nozzle too close to the printing surface may interfere with the printing process and place additional loads on the concrete. Research proposes a print height equal to the width of the nozzle.

==== Print speed ====
The speed at which the print head is set also influences the bonding strength. Increasing the nozzle speed generally decreases the adhesive strength, as the concrete has little time to set into place. However, taking too long to print successive layers reduces interlayer bonding, so a balance must be established that accounts for strength without premature collapse. Other factors that influence the quality of 3D printed concrete include the pumps and controls used to monitor the printer, as well as the concrete mix design (See section on Mix Design).

=== 3D printer suppliers ===
3D concrete printing technology has grown exponentially over the last decade and is expected to continue to grow as researchers learn more about the software, hardware, and construction capabilities of these printers. Below are some notable companies and 3D printers that are used globally:

Notable Suppliers of 3D Printers for Concrete
Company	Headquarters	Printer name (type)	Notes
XtreeE	France	1K / 2K / 3K+ series (Robotic arm)	French‑designed and assembled printers. The current xHEAD v4.0 reaches up to 10 L/min. Seventeen systems were installed worldwide by June 2024, including new units in Germany and at NIST in the US, and at least eighteen by June 2025 with the first deployment in Latin America at Holcim México.
COBOD	Denmark	BOD2 (Gantry)	The fastest and most widely used construction 3D printer on the market, with print speeds up to 1000 mm/s. Can achieve layer widths up to 100mm and heights up to 40 mm
WASP	Italy	Crane Wasp (Crane/Gantry)	Can reconfigure its steel supports to accommodate site constraints and project applications, printing areas up to 100 square meters
Vertico	Netherlands	EVA (Robotic Arm)	Available as a fixed setup or on a track. Has a build volume of 2.7m x 10m x 3.0m. Also offers robotic arms for labs and smaller scaled projects
CyBe	Netherlands	CyBe GR (Gantry Robot)	Best suited for printing modules as opposed to entire structures by combining Gantry with Robotic systems. CyBe also offers threeother robotic printers: a fixed robot arm, a portable robot arm attached to a crawler system, and a robot arm on a fixed track.
ICON	Texas, USA	Vulcan (Gantry)	Prints areas up to 3,000 square feet (about 280 square meters) at a speed of about 5 to 7 inches per minute. Certified to perform under all weather conditions
Constructions-3D	France	MaxiPrinter (Crane/Robotic Arm)	Features a crane arm attached to a crawler system. Extremely portable and easy to transport due to its unique, flexible design
ROSO	Taiwan	LiquidStoneConcrete	The 3D printing method for hollow concrete structures strategically utilizes the material only where necessary, thereby achieving a more sustainable approach to concrete architecture.
Luyten 3D	Melbourne, Australia	Platypus X12	First multi-storey 3D construction printer in the Southern Hemisphere, featuring a telescoping crane system, AI-driven precision, and a contour-compliant nozzle.
Everplast & 樂土 Lotos	Taiwan	Robotic Arm / Extrusion	Developed an eco-friendly 3D concrete printing system using circular cementitious materials (e.g., recycled inorganic wastes and oyster shell powder) to reduce carbon emissions in construction.

== Mix design ==
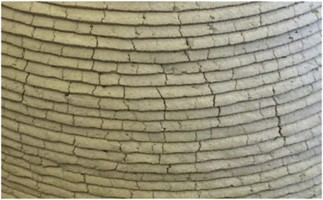
Shrinkage cracking in 3D printed concrete due to insufficient mix design and curing

=== Critical mix properties ===
For 3D printed concrete, buildability and extrudability are two of the most critical design properties for a mix. Extrudability is the mixture's ability to pass through nozzles in the printing head, while buildability is the capacity to support additional layers. These properties are governed by the consistency, cohesiveness, and stability of the mixture, which stem from the mix design and selected materials. For both properties, a balance must be met between stiffness and workability. A stiff mix will increase strength, but decrease flow rate and print speed, potentially clogging the printer head. Conversely, decreasing the stiffness too much may increase workability and extrudability at the expense of strength and buildability.

Since concrete is printed in layers, layers must sufficiently bond to each other to allow for proper curing and full-strength capacity. Significant research has been conducted to create an optimal mix for 3D printing, although there are no current industry standards. However, the use of supplementary cementitious materials (SCMs) such as metakaolin, fly ash, silica fume, and superplasticizers are common in all 3D printed concrete mixtures (See section on Admixtures).

=== Cementitious materials ===
Cementitious materials are integral to any concrete mix design. These materials serve as the binder that holds the mix together, as they chemically react with water to undergo the curing process. Portland cement is the most common material in construction for both 3D printed and traditional concrete applications due to its low cost and widespread availability. However, its high setting time and low bonding ability are disadvantageous for 3D printed applications. Therefore, polymers and other admixtures are often added to reduce shrinkage and improve adhesion. Some of these polymers include rubber, mixed sand aggregates, carbon-sulfur polymers, and geopolymers, which also have added benefits of crack repair and resistance.

One alternative is sulfoaluminate cement which can be mixed with Portland Cement to quicken the hydration process and help develop early concrete strength after placement. While the setting time of Portland Cement is about half an hour, the setting time for sulfoaluminate cement is just six minutes. Therefore, higher strength can be achieved in a much shorter time period, increasing buildability.

=== Aggregates ===
Aggregate content and selection are just as important as the selected cementitious materials when it comes to concrete mix design. In particular, particle size has a significant effect on 3D-printed concrete mixes. Particle sizes that are too large may block the nozzle of the 3D printer, while aggregates that are too small decrease the strength of the mix and can cause cracking. A rule of thumb for mix design is that the maximum aggregate particle size should be less than 1/10 of the nozzle diameter to ensure smooth extrusion.

Several studies have been conducted to examine the influence of aggregate size on mechanical properties for 3D printed concrete. It was found that increasing coarse aggregate improves the volumetric stability of concrete and decreases hydration heat and shrinkage, which were common problems in early 3D-printed concrete mixes. The use of coarse aggregate also increases the concrete deposition rate and printhead speed, which can increase printing efficiency and productivity. Therefore, the printed structure achieves greater stability and strength, as observed by Ivanova and Mechtcherine. There is a limit to coarse aggregate content and size, as the challenge of controlling rheology becomes apparent. Natural aggregates such as sand and gravel are preferred as they require less energy to produce compared to artificial aggregates, but aggregate selection can be limited by regional deposits.

=== Admixtures ===
Admixtures include any materials outside of water, aggregates, and cementitious materials, that affect the concrete mix properties. Especially in 3D printed concrete, these admixtures are critical to balancing buildability, workability, and extrudability. Fly ash is the main admixture for high-performance 3D printed concrete, as it improves working performance and durability. However, large amounts of fly ash can lead to slower development of strength and buildability, which is why it is often mixed with other admixtures like clay, to retain shape stability.

Silica fume is another common admixture for 3D printed concrete mixes, as it increases the initial strength of printed concrete as well as flexural strength once the concrete cures. The main advantage of silica fume is that its small particles fill in the void spaces around the larger aggregates, which improves bonding performance with the cement binder. This also helps optimize the particle size distribution of the mix, which increases yield stress and buildability.

=== Mechanical properties ===
As with standard concrete mixes, mixes for 3D printed concrete are typically tested for their compressive and flexural strength. These mechanical properties are highly dependent on the mix design and can be improved by adding admixtures such as the ones described in the above section. For a mix containing ordinary Portland Cement, fly ash, silica fume, and fine glass aggregates, the compressive strength is around 36 to 57 MPa, which is comparable to the compressive strength of normal-weight concrete. High-performance concrete strengths of over 100 MPa have also been achieved by using superplasticizers and additional chemicals, but these mixes are more energy-intensive to produce.

For 3D printed concrete, the structural properties are largely influenced by the interlayer bonding performance. Increasing the print speed and printhead height can reduce the interlayer bond strength while adding a mortar between the layers can improve this strength. In particular, a resin mortar composed of black charcoal, sulfur, and sand has been found to be effective.

=== Concrete suppliers for 3D printing ===
Since there are no standards set for 3D printing concrete mix design, companies often pursue their own research and development if they decide to offer 3D printing as a construction service. Below are some notable companies that have successfully implemented 3D concrete printing into their scope of services.

Notable Suppliers of 3D Printed Concrete
Company	Headquarters	Mix	Notes
Sika USA	New Jersey, USA	Sikacrete 7100 3D	Ready-to-use mix that consists of cementitious powder with fibers and liquid polymers
CyBe	Netherlands	CyBe Mortar	Sets in three minutes and achieves full strength in one hour with low concentrations of chloride and sulphates
HeidelbergCement	Germany	i.tech 3D	Used to construct the first 3D printed house in Germany
ICON	Texas, USA	Lavacrete	Mix unique to ICON that is integrated with their Magma feeding system and Vulcan printers
LafargeHolcim	Switzerland	Tector 3D Build	The first dry mortar product for 3D printing with strengths up to 90 MPa
CEMEX	Mexico	D.fab	Has a CO2 footprint 1.5 times lower than mortars typically used in 3D printed concrete available on the market
Luyten 3D	Melbourne, Australia	Ultimatecrete	Independently tested and certified by the National Association of Testing Authorities, Australia (NATA), Ultimatecrete reportedly achieves a compressive strength of 82.5MPa after 28 days. The extended product, UltraEco reduces CO2 emissions by 20% compared to the original Ultimatecrete mixture.

== Notable projects and applications ==
Due to challenges of reinforcement and limitations in printing technology, applications of 3D printed concrete have been mostly limited to small-scale projects, including models and residential homes, as opposed to large commercial buildings. There are, however, some notable projects around the world that demonstrate the potential of 3D-printed concrete.

=== Constructions-3D: La Citadelle des savoir-faire ===
La Citadelle Des Savoir-Faire is a project that employs 3D concrete printing to construct complex architectural structures. Located in France, this initiative aims to demonstrate the capabilities of 3D printing technology in sustainable construction. The Citadelle serves as an educational center where professionals and students can learn about and experiment with this technology. The project focuses on using eco-friendly materials and advanced design techniques, contributing to the reduction of the construction sector's carbon footprint. Once completed, this complex will have a total internal floor space of about 2565 square meters (27 600 sq ft).

A notable achievement of La Citadelle Des Savoir-Faire is the construction of the world's tallest 3D-printed building, La Tour. Built in 2023, this three-story building has set a new world record for its height at 14.14 m (46.4 ft), illustrating the potential of 3D printing technology in creating large-scale structures

=== ICON: 3D-printed homes ===
ICON completed a project in March 2020 for seven 3D-printed homes in Austin, Texas. Each 400 ft^{2} home was printed in just 27 hours using ICON's Vulcan printer. The first residents moved into the homes in 2020 and are estimated to house 480 of the city's homeless, about 40% of the city's homeless population.

In 2022, ICON and Lennar built Wolf Ranch in Texas, a community of 100 homes that use 3D printed technology.

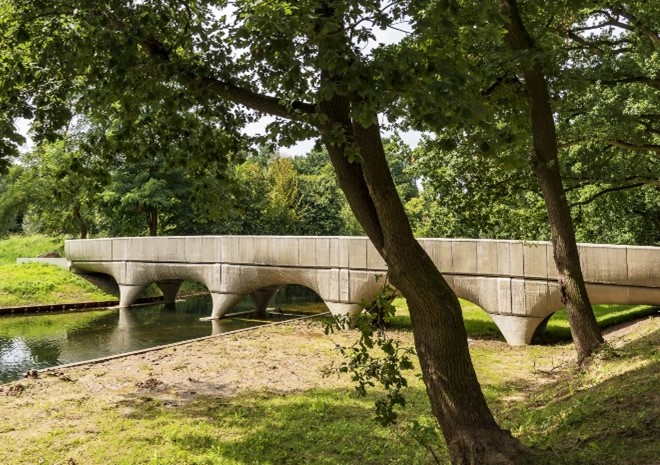
The world's longest 3D printed concrete bridge in Nijmegen, Netherlands

=== Habitat for Humanity: Affordable Homes Fast ===
In 2021, Habitat for Humanity, the world's largest non-profit home builder organization, built two 3D-printed homes in Williamsburg, Virginia, and Tempe, Arizona. The Virginia home was 1,200 ft^{2} and printed in just 28 hours with a COBOD 3D printer, which was about four weeks faster than standard construction. The organization estimated that the 3D-printed concrete walls saved about 15% per square foot in building costs. The 1,738 ft^{2} home in Arizona was constructed in the summer: a time when construction typically halts due to the extreme heat. 80% of the home was constructed using 3D printing including the interior and exterior walls, while the remainder, such as the roof, was constructed using traditional methods. Habitat for Humanity hopes that 3D printed homes can be a solution for affordable housing as well as labor shortages in extreme climates and environments.

=== PERI: Project Milestone ===
The first 3D-printed residential building in Germany was constructed in September 2020 by PERI, using COBOD's BOD2 printer and Heidelberg Cement's concrete mixture. 24 concrete elements were printed at a facility and then transported to the site for assembly. The printer created 1 m^{2} of wall every 5 minutes, completing the 160m^{2} home by November 2020. Only two operators were required to print the walls, which included water placement, electricity, and pipe connections.

=== Nijmegen, Netherlands: pedestrian bridge ===
In 2021, the Dutch city of Nijmegen revealed the world's longest 3D-printed concrete pedestrian bridge, spanning 29 meters. It was estimated that 3D printed saved about 50% in materials because concrete was only placed where structural strength was required. 3D-printed bridge components were manufactured by BAM and Weber Beamix offsite, where it was then transported and assembled on-site. The previous record holder for the longest 3D-printed concrete bridge was 26 meters, constructed by Tsinghua University in Shanghai.

== Economic impacts ==
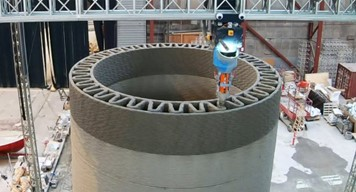
3D printed concrete walls for wind turbine bases use less material by implementing a lattice structure

In terms of cost and economics, one advantage of 3D printed concrete is that it does not require formwork, which is used to form the mold for conventional concrete pouring. Formwork can account for up to 50% of total concrete construction due to material and labor costs. However, there are costs associated with machinery including the print head nozzles and supplemental monitoring devices. In addition, 3D printed concrete mixtures often differ from conventional concrete with additions of nano-clay, nano-silica, and other chemical admixtures that aid the extrusion process.

There are indirect economic benefits from 3D-printed concrete in terms of productivity. The construction sector is often highly traditional and for the most part, processes have remained similar over the past decades. This is in large part because current processes are still effective in many construction applications. For example, a study by Garcia de Soto compared a robotically fabricated and conventionally constructed wall assembly with different degrees of complexity and found that conventional construction outperformed robotic fabrication for simpler walls, while the robot was more productive as geometric complexity increased. There was no additional cost due to robotic fabrication and for both cases, material production was the driving factor for cost, as opposed to construction procedures.

== Environmental impact ==
The environmental impact of 3D-printed concrete is heavily dependent on the processes and materials used for a given project. 3D printed concrete has the potential to reduce material in the production of concrete due to the elimination of formwork, but the specialized admixtures and required technology may have just as much of an impact on the environment as conventional concrete construction. A cradle-to-grave life-cycle assessment (LCA) comparing the environmental impact of a conventionally constructed concrete wall with a 3D-printed concrete wall revealed that the 3D-printed alternative only reduced environmental effects when no reinforcement was used. The LCA impacts of global warming potential, acidification potential, eutrophication potential, and smog formation potential were used to measure environmental impacts. Once reinforcement was introduced to the 3D-printed concrete structure, these impacts were greater than conventional construction methods, specifically for global warming and smog formation potential.

Another LCA conducted a similar study comparing conventional and 3D-printed concrete walls but varied the complexity of the structure. It was found that as the complexity of the structure increased, the 3D printed method showed a lower environmental impact. This was mostly due to the ability of 3D-printed concrete to achieve complex forms while saving building materials in terms of formwork and concrete volume. Overall, the environmental impact of 3D-printed concrete is influenced by the structure's design and how well the engineer can optimize material usage. On a material basis, the environmental impacts are similar to that of conventional concrete, as a cement binder is still required. However, the streamlined construction process that comes with 3D printing decreases material waste and onsite emissions.

Based on four examples, it has been estimated that the contribution of greenhouse gas emissions per square meter associated with the construction of 3D-printed houses is lower than that of conventionally built ones.

== Challenges and limitations ==
Several limitations prevent 3D concrete printing from being widely adopted throughout the construction industry. First, the material palette that can be used for 3D printed concrete is limited, particularly due to nozzle extrusion and the deposition process of concrete layers, which introduces the challenge of premature collapsing. Therefore, research on material properties and developing high-quality cementitious materials that comply with both structural concrete codes and 3D printing applications is a current area of focus. Due to the sensitivity of a concrete mix, a change in cement type, aggregate, or admixture will impact concrete properties and behavior.

Current building codes consider concrete as a homogenous material when in reality, concrete is anisotropic. This anisotropy is further exposed with printed layers, so new methods for estimating deformations and cracking must be developed. In addition, current material testing for concrete consists of cylindrical specimens in accordance with ASTM C39. There is currently no systematic or theoretical basis for 3D printed concrete, especially when it comes to standard testing.

Current 3D printed projects have been limited to model prototyping and low-rise, large-area buildings as opposed to high-rise commercial buildings because of restrictions in 3D printer technology. Printers need to be compatible with the height of the building, so additional research in 3D printer stability and design is required. There are also challenges with reinforcement in concrete 3D printing, which is required for taller structures.

== Research and development ==
Pioneering research on the topic of 3D concrete printing is conducted at the ETH Zurich, Loughborough University, Swinburne University of Technology, Eindhoven University of Technology, and the Institute for Advanced Architecture of Catalonia, among many other institutions.

=== Conferences ===
Due to the increased interest in 3D concrete printing both from industry and academia, a number of conferences have started internationally. Two industry-focused international conferences were organized in February and November 2017 by 3DPrinthused in Copenhagen. Subsequently, the biannual Digital Concrete academic conference was organized at the ETH Zürich in 2018, the Eindhoven Institute of Technology in 2020, and at the University of Loughborough in 2022. A parallel series of recurring conferences, focusing on the Asia-Pacific region, was organized at the Swinburne University of Technology in 2018, Tianjin University in 2019, and Shanghai Tongji and Hebei Universities in 2020.

== See also ==
Concrete printing can be used directly to produce the final part, or indirectly, to produce formwork in which concrete is cast or sprayed.

3D-printed formworks address some of the major challenges of 3D concrete printing. Reinforcement bars can be integrated conventionally, and the conventionally cast or sprayed concrete complies with building codes. Additionally, the surface quality of concrete is significantly better than in 3D concrete printing. To achieve a smooth surface, the 3D-printed formworks can be coated or polished.

=== 3D-printed concrete as formwork ===
3D concrete printing with layered extrusion has been used to produce stay-in-place formworks for casting concrete. In this approach, a thin shell, consisting of one or two 3D-printed contours is produced in a first step, either in a prefabrication plant or directly in situ. Subsequently, reinforcement cages are installed and secured in position. Finally, concrete is cast inside the shell, either in one go or in several steps to prevent the build-up of hydrostatic pressure in the lower sections of the formwork.

For structural calculations, the 3D-printed shell is usually ignored, and only the cast concrete is considered load-bearing. However, the 3D-printed shell may be considered for the necessary concrete reinforcement cover that protects the steel from corrosion.

=== 3D-printed formworks for concrete ===
Alternatively, 3D printing with non-cementitious materials can be employed for the production of formworks for concrete. Extrusion printing with clay, foam, wax, and polymers, as well as binder jetting with sand and stereolithography, have been used for the fabrication of formworks for architectural concrete components.

== See also ==
- Construction 3D printing
- Reinforcement in concrete 3D printing
- 3D printing
- 3D printing processes
- Applications of 3D printing
- Residential construction
- Slip forming
- Contour crafting
