= Geography of robotics =

Robotics is the branch of technology that deals with the design, construction, operation, structural disposition, manufacture and application of robots. Robotics is related to the sciences of electronics, engineering, mechanics, and software.

== United States ==
Robots of the United States include simple household robots such as Roomba to sophisticated autonomous aircraft such as the MQ-9 Reaper that costs 18 million dollars per unit. The first industrial robot, robot company and exoskeletons as well as the first dynamically balancing, organic, and nanoscale robots originate from the United States.

== Japan ==
Japan has a long robotics history and high reputation in the robotics area. Approximately 700,000 industrial robots were used all over the world in 1995, of which 500,000 was used only in Japan.

== See also ==
- List of robots
- Robotics in China
- Robotics in Iran
