= Supermarket scanner moment =

Portrayal of an American politician as out-of-touch

A supermarket scanner moment is a political gaffe in which a politician is portrayed as out-of-touch with everyday affairs. The term derives from a 1992 New York Times report that characterized sitting U.S. President George H. W. Bush as being amazed by commonplace supermarket barcode scanner technology at a grocers' convention. Political commentators widely spread the story, portraying Bush as unfamiliar with daily American life. Though other major media outlets soon refuted the report as a mischaracterization, the popular memory of Bush's reported amazement at a supermarket scanner remains one of the most enduring American political myths.

== Bush event and coverage ==
Then he grabbed a quart of milk, a light bulb and a bag of candy and ran them over an electronic scanner. The look of wonder flickered across his face again as he saw the item and price registered on the cash register screen.

"This is for checking out?" asked Mr. Bush. "I just took a tour through the exhibits here," he told the grocers later. "Amazed by some of the technology."

— The New York Times report from the National Grocers Association convention, February 5, 1992

In February 1992, during the U.S. presidential primaries for what would be his unsuccessful re-election campaign, U.S. President George H. W. Bush attended a convention of the National Grocers Association in Orlando. The sole newspaper journalist permitted to cover the appearance, Gregg McDonald for the Houston Chronicle, filed a two-paragraph pool report that mentioned in passing the president's "look of wonder" as he interacted with a supermarket electronic barcode scanner demonstration. Before giving a speech to the grocers, Bush browsed new grocer technology, including a model checkout counter by NCR Corporation. He was impressed by their new scanner technology, which could weigh produce and read damaged barcodes. The reporter did not consider the aspect of Bush's reaction to be significant enough to cover in his final story.

Based on McDonald's pool report, Andrew Rosenthal, a reporter for The New York Times, wrote a front-page story about Bush's appearance at the convention that painted him as being out-of-touch with everyday American life. Titled "Bush Encounters the Supermarket, Amazed", the story contextualized Bush as being among the social elite, quoted him as being "amazed by some of the technology", and presented him as witnessing supermarket electronic barcode scanner technology, which had been in use for some 16 years, for the first time. Pundits, broadcasters, political cartoonists, and columnists picked up the story, casting Bush as understanding neither commonplace supermarket occurrences nor daily life in America.

Other major news outlets did not agree with The New York Times's interpretation, as Time and Newsweek described the scene as unexceptional news and Bush as unamazed. The individual who performed the demonstration said that Bush was familiar with conventional scanner technology. As Time later put it, all eyewitness accounts refuted The New York Times story. CBS Radio correspondent Charles Osgood corrected his prior broadcast. The New York Times did not issue a correction, defending the report and citing video footage in which Bush interacted with conventional and new scanners and was both "unfamiliar with" and "clearly impressed" by conventional scanners.

For its part, the White House belatedly decried the mischaracterization a week later. Bush himself angrily wrote to The New York Times chairman Arthur Ochs Sulzberger decrying inaccuracies in the report. In a reply, Sulzberger conceded that the article had been mildly "naughty" and that the paper did not expect it to attract the attention it had.

== Legacy and comparisons ==
President Bush

The "supermarket scanner moment", that Bush had been too out-of-touch with common people to understand a quotidian supermarket scanner, became an enduring American political myth, still alive after many years despite widespread refutation. One version of the myth places Bush in a supermarket rather than at a convention. The Washington Post credits the myth's persistence to human psychological propensity to remember stories that feel plausible and to not forget debunked stories. Retrospectively analyzed, the myth had exacerbated negative impressions of Bush while he was already blamed for the country's handling of the early 1990s recession and defending against an election primary opponent. As the public already suspected that he did not do his own shopping, wrote Snopes, the situation was a ready recipe for portraying Bush as unfamiliar with both managing the economy and how people bought groceries. Conservative columnist Jonah Goldberg described the incident as "politically devastating" for the president, whose popularity declined in public polls in the lead-up to the general election he would lose that year. Bush's press secretary Marlin Fitzwater dedicated four pages of his memoir to lambasting the media coverage of the event.

During the 2012 presidential election, MSNBC reported on a speech the Republican candidate Mitt Romney had given during a Pennsylvania campaign stop as being another supermarket scanner moment. In the excerpt, Romney marveled at how a touchscreen at a local convenience store worked. Time and Politico wrote that the larger context, that he was making a point about government regulation of business, ruined the connotation that Romney was unfamiliar with common consumer technology. Under pressure that the excerpt was out of context, MSNBC played the longer clip the next day without further comment.

In the 2022 United States Senate election in Pennsylvania, the Republican candidate Mehmet Oz ("Dr. Oz") recorded a video about the cost of food that was mocked for his choice of vegetables and reference to "crudité", which locals more often called a "veggie tray". The incident was compared with Bush's supermarket scanner moment.
