= Eric (robot) =

Early British robot

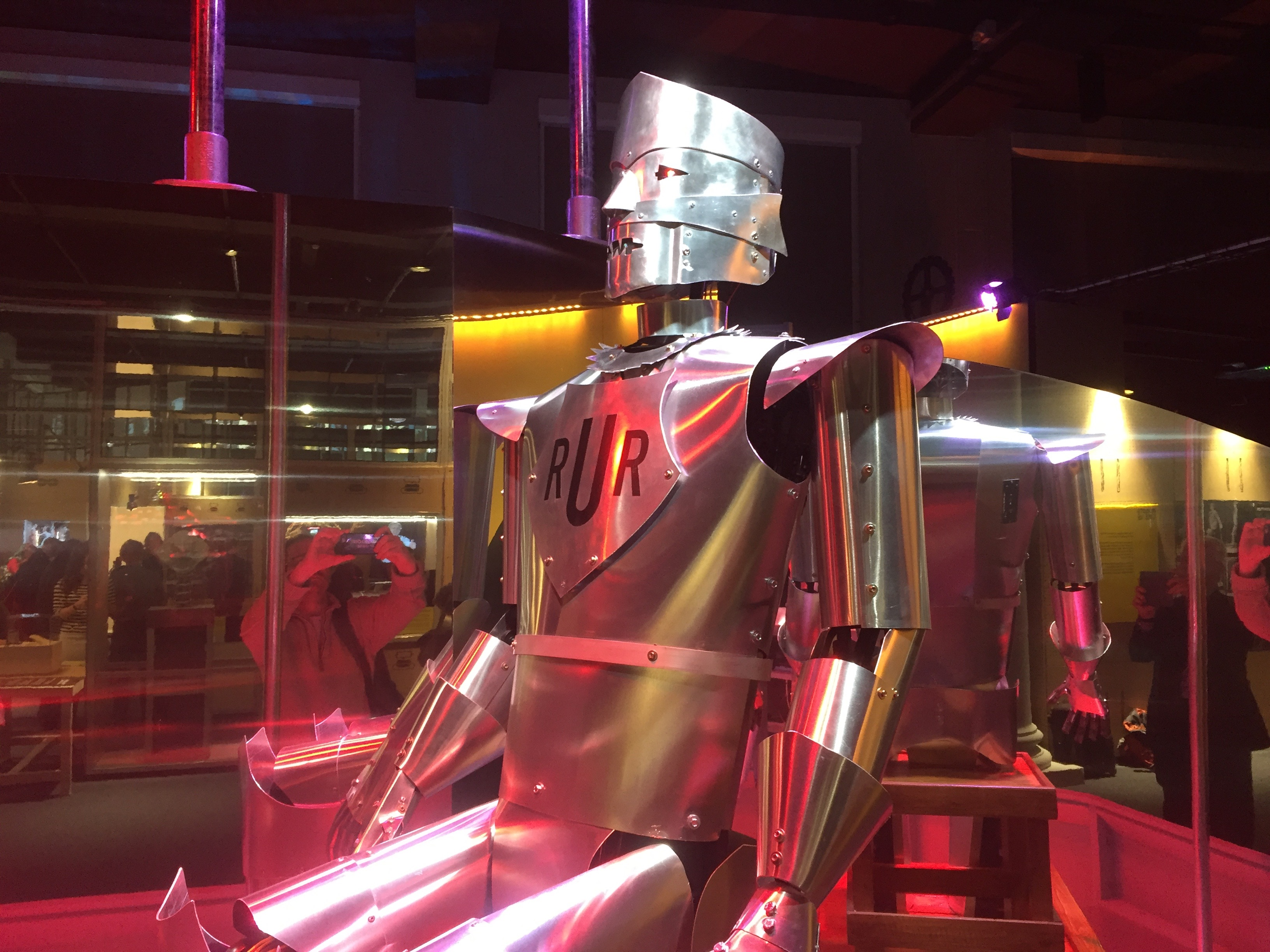
Eric rebuilt in 2017

Eric was the first British robot, built in 1928 by First World War veteran Captain William Richards, and aircraft engineer Alan Reffell. He was constructed to open the Exhibition of the Society of Model Engineers at London's Royal Horticultural Hall in 1928, after George VI (then the Duke of York) cancelled and an exasperated Richards, the exhibition's secretary, offered to "make a man of tin" to take the Duke's place. At the event's opening, Eric rose to his feet, bowed and gave a four-minute opening address.

The robot was operated by two people, and Eric's voice was received live by a radio signal, Richards claiming to be working under a license of the Marconi Company. Although able to sit and stand, Eric could not move his legs to walk. His chest bore the letters "R.U.R.", a reference to the robot manufacturer in Karel Čapek's 1920 play of the same name.

Following his first appearance, Eric was taken on a US tour, introducing himself to an audience in New York in 1929 as "Eric the robot, the man without a soul". The New York Press described him as "the perfect man". Some time after this, Eric disappeared. Having researched Eric's story, Science Museum curator Ben Russell concluded that "no-one quite knows what happened to him, whether he was blown-up or taken to pieces for spare parts".

In 2016, the London Science Museum raised funds through a Kickstarter campaign to rebuild Eric, working from archive material including Illustrated London News photographs. Eric was added to the museum's permanent collection, and appeared as part of a 2017 robots exhibition.

== George ==
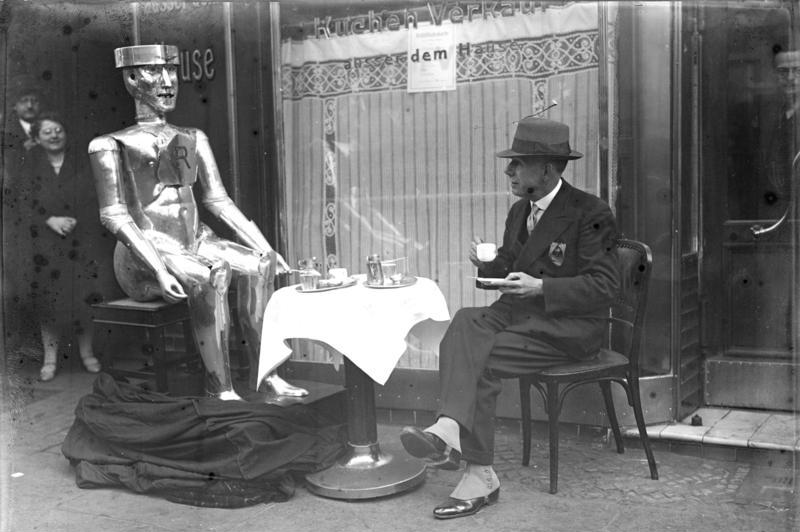
George, a later model of Eric, taking breakfast with his inventor William Richards in Berlin, 1930

In the 1930s, William Richards built a similar robot called "George", which toured the world including Germany and Australia. George could deliver speeches in French, German, Hindustani, Chinese and Danish. He cost almost £2,000 to build, compared to Eric's £140, and The Age newspaper described him as "the educated gentleman, alongside his rough-hewn awkward brother".

== See also ==
- Alpha, another early British robot
