= Helfenberg =

- Municipality
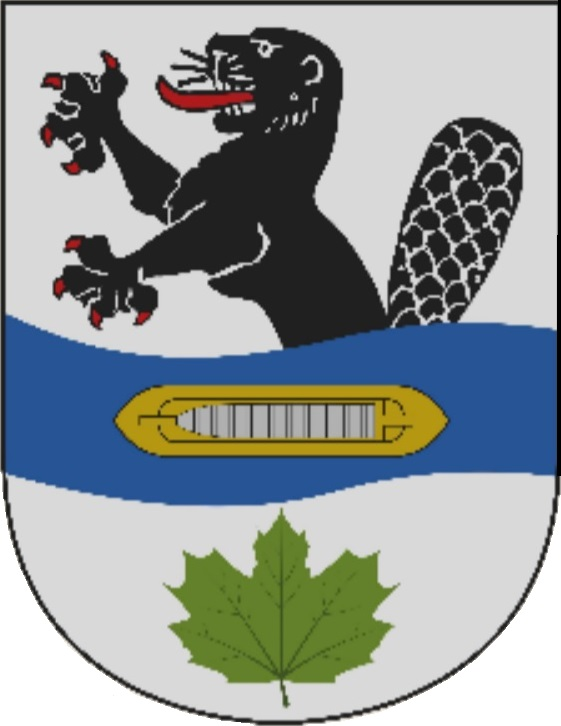
- Coat of arms

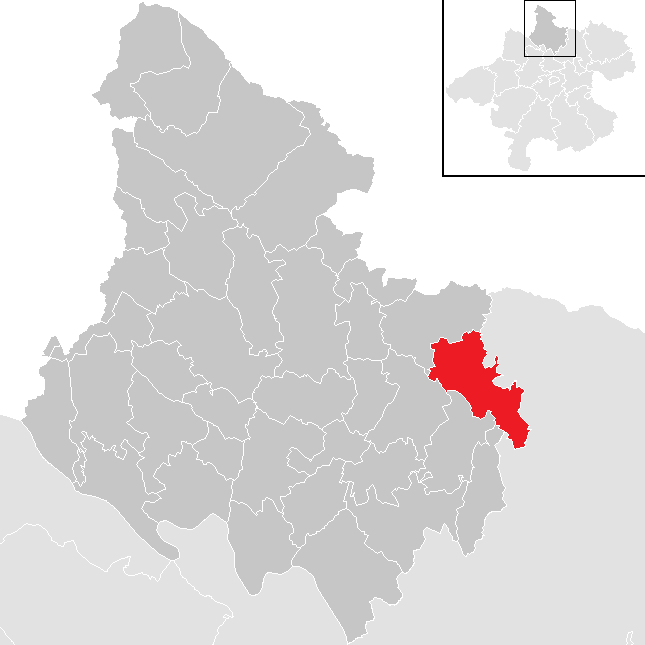
- Location in the district

- Location within Austria Location within Upper Austria
- Coordinates: 48°32′36″N 14°08′33″E
- Country: Austria
- State: Upper Austria
- District: Rohrbach

Government
  - Mayor: Josef Hinterberger (ÖVP)

Area
  - Total: 9.61 km^{2} (3.71 sq mi)
- Elevation: 567 m (1,860 ft)

Population (14 June 2016)
  - Total: 1,004
  - Density: 104/km^{2} (271/sq mi)
- Time zone: UTC+1 (CET)
  - Summer (DST): UTC+2 (CEST)
- Postal code: 4184
- Area code: 0 72 16
- Vehicle registration: RO
- Website: www.helfenberg.at

Helfenberg is a municipality in the district of Rohrbach in the Austrian state of Upper Austria.

== Population ==
Historical population
| Year | Pop. | ±% |
|---|---|---|
| 1869 | 1,270 | — |
| 1880 | 1,171 | −7.8% |
| 1890 | 1,091 | −6.8% |
| 1900 | 1,118 | +2.5% |
| 1910 | 1,009 | −9.7% |
| 1923 | 1,006 | −0.3% |
| 1934 | 1,154 | +14.7% |
| 1939 | 1,112 | −3.6% |
| 1951 | 1,125 | +1.2% |
| 1961 | 1,143 | +1.6% |
| 1971 | 1,194 | +4.5% |
| 1981 | 1,141 | −4.4% |
| 1991 | 1,116 | −2.2% |
| 2001 | 1,053 | −5.6% |
| 2011 | 961 | −8.7% |
| 2017 | 989 | +2.9% |
