= Bernt Øivind Børnich =

Norwegian roboticist and entrepreneur

Bernt Børnich
- Born: Bernt Øivind Børnich
- Occupations: Roboticist, entrepreneur
- Known for: Founder and CEO of 1X Technologies

Bernt Øivind Børnich is a Norwegian roboticist and entrepreneur. He is the founder and chief executive officer of 1X Technologies (formerly Halodi Robotics), a Norwegian-American robotics and artificial intelligence company developing humanoid robots. Børnich is a leading proponent of low-energy, tendon-driven actuation.

== Early life ==
Børnich was raised in Norway.

== Career ==
=== Halodi Robotics ===
Børnich founded Halodi Robotics in Moss, Norway in 2014 with the goal of producing general-purpose robots to help meet global labor demand. Børnich has pursued low-gear-ratio, tendon-driven systems whose joints remain compliant on contact, initially developing servo motors as the foundation of a low-energy approach to robotics intended to be safe around humans.

In 2020, the company partnered with Everon (ADT) to deploy androids for night guarding of commercial buildings in the United States, and in 2022 it began a partnership with OpenAI on embodied learning. In 2022, Halodi deployed its wheeled humanoid EVE in industrial settings. In 2023, he began placing the company's robots in homes, including his own, where EVE performed household tasks.

=== 1X Technologies ===
In 2023, Børnich rebranded Halodi as 1X Technologies and refocused the company on humanoid robots for domestic use. He spoke at the Humanoids Summit in Mountain View, California, on December 11, 2024. In January 2025, 1X acquired the robotics startup Kind Humanoid, expanding its operations in the San Francisco Bay Area.

==== NEO ====
In March 2025, Børnich announced that 1X planned to place NEO Gamma, its bipedal humanoid unveiled the previous month, in "a few hundred to a few thousand" homes by the end of 2025 as part of an early adopter program. In April 2025, he presented NEO on stage as a speaker at the TED2025 conference.

In October 2025, Børnich opened pre-orders for NEO, with United States deliveries planned for 2026. In November 2025, Børnich predicted that household robots could achieve full autonomy by around 2027 and reach ten percent of American homes by around 2030.

On April 30, 2026, Børnich announced the commencement of full-scale production of NEO at the company's factory in Hayward, California.

== Design philosophy ==
Børnich has stated that 1X's mission is "to create an abundance of labor through intelligent machines," citing labor shortages and aging populations as core problems humanoid robotics can address. He has argued that the high-gear-ratio actuators of industrial robots store unsafe levels of kinetic energy, and that home robots must instead be low-energy, soft, and compliant by design.

Børnich has cited Japanese robotics and design as foundational influences, stating that Japanese art and design are "at the core" of his work.

== Personal life ==
Børnich grew up in Norway. He relocated from Norway to the San Francisco Bay Area as 1X moved its headquarters to Palo Alto in 2025. He has a daughter.
