= Lily Robotics =

Lily was a California-based drone brand that shut down after filing for bankruptcy in 2017. It is owned by Mota Group, Inc. and headquartered in San Jose, California.

== History ==
Lily Robotics was founded in 2013 in Berkeley, California by UC Berkeley alums Antoine Balaresque and Henry Bradlow, with the goal of designing and manufacturing a quadcopter camera drone. Both founders worked together at the UC Berkeley Robotics Laboratory.

The idea for Lily's first product, the Lily Camera, came in the summer of 2013 after Balaresque returned from a family trip to Yosemite National Park and noticed that his mother was missing from all of the photos because she was behind the camera.

The founders secured a seed round in spring 2014 led by Shana Fisher and SV Angel, and in 2015 the company expanded to employ approximately 50 individuals.

In May 2015, the company announced the Lily Camera, an autonomous flying camera that combined GPS and computer vision technology to record stills and video of users autonomously via a wearable tracking device. The company received approximately 60 thousand pre-orders for the device, collecting over $34 million in pre-sale revenue. International Business Times compared the new startup to the Zano, a similar camera-drone project which was still in development at the time, but later failed and closed down.

In December 2015, Lily reportedly closed a Series A funding round of $14 million, led by Spark Capital. Other notable Lily investors were the Stanford StartX fund, the DJ Steve Aoki and the former San Francisco 49ers quarterback Joe Montana. The founders announced that the original February 2016 release date for pre-order customers would be delayed until summer 2016.

== Closure, lawsuit, bankruptcy, and asset-acquisition ==
On January 12, 2017, around 4AM UTC, Lily sent an email to all their customers notifying them that the camera could not be produced and they would receive a refund. The company closed owing $34 million.

On the same day, the District Attorney of San Francisco filed a lawsuit against Lily alleging that the startup intentionally deceived customers. According to the lawsuit, Lily faked demonstration videos using products from other manufacturers. In late January 2017, the San Francisco police, seeking evidence for criminal charges related to the company's failure, conducted a raid of the Lily Robotics offices.

On February 27, 2017, Lily Robotics filed a voluntary petition for relief under chapter 11 of the United States Bankruptcy Code in the United States Bankruptcy Court for the District of Delaware. The company also issued a notice to customers stating: "We will try to refund all of our customers' pre-order payments during the bankruptcy. However, we need Bankruptcy Court approval of a refund process to make those payments. To begin the process, the Company filed a motion on March 13, 2017 asking the Bankruptcy Court to approve the refund process."

On May 30, 2017, Mota Group Inc. acquired assets of Lily and its brand. The company, already managing other brands and drone lines, introduced Lily Next-Gen™ with superior 2017 technology based on the original Lily approach of simplicity and market.

== The Lily Camera ==
Lily's original flagship product, the Lily Camera, was a quadcopter drone designed to be used as a self-propelled camera. The device has a waterproof rating of IP67. It is built out of black polycarbonate and brushed aluminum, and weighs approximately 2.8 pounds (1.3 kg). The Lily Camera contains 7 types of sensors: an accelerometer, a three-axis gyroscope, a magnetometer, a Barometer, GPS, a front-facing camera, and a bottom-facing camera. The camera captures video with 1080p resolution at 60 frames per second, and 720p at 120 frames per second.

Like the Lily Camera, the wearable tracker has a waterproof rating of IP67. The tracker contains 5 sensors: an accelerometer, a barometer, GPS, a microphone, and a small vibration motor.

Lily Next-Gen™ included the same type of form factor but with 4K camera, a standalone remote and up to 36 minutes of flying time with combined battery.

== See also ==
- Zano (drone) - a similar project to create a quadcopter drone with a camera, which failed under similar circumstances
