= Bebionic =

Prosthetic hand

Bebionic is a commercial prosthetic hand designed to enable amputees to perform everyday activities, such as eating, drinking, writing, typing, turning a key in a lock and picking up small objects. The first version of the Bebionic hand was launched at the World Congress and Orthopädie & Reha-Technik, Trade Show, Leipzig, Germany, in May 2010. Designed in the United Kingdom, the Bebionic hand is manufactured by RSL Steeper and is available worldwide. Since February 2, 2017, Bebionic is owned by Ottobock.

== Technical specification ==
Dimensions

The Bebionic hand is available in either a large or a medium size. The following table shows the dimensions of the two different prostheses.

Part of the hand	Large	Medium
Middle finger tip to hand base	200 mm	190 mm
Thumb tip to hand base	125 mm	121 mm
Diameter of chassis at wrist	50 mm	50 mm
Weight	572 - 598 g	565 - 591 g

Grips

The Bebionic hand offers fourteen different gripping options, of which the user can select a total of eight options, allowing the user to perform a relatively wide variety of tasks. This number of grips can be achieved because the thumb can take two different positions according to the user's needs: the lateral position and the opposition position. In the lateral position, the thumb is parallel to the fingers of the hand, allowing holds such as pointing the finger. In the opposition position, the thumb is opposite to the palm, allowing for grips that can grasp, pinch or hold objects.

On the back of the hand, there is a button that will allow the holder of the prosthesis to choose the grip. In fact, this button offers the possibility to choose between two programs, the primary and the secondary. Each of these programs allows two different types of sockets. To switch from one to the other, the user must apply an OPEN OPEN signal, i.e. they must send another OPEN signal after fully opening the hand.

In total with the two different thumb positions, we get to 2 × 2 × 2 = 8 different grips, each with a specific name:

- Tripod: This is possible when the thumb is in the opposition position. We then have the index and middle fingers in contact with the thumb. For the other two remaining fingers, they continue to close until they reach the palm of the hand and therefore feel a resistance. It is therefore a fairly common grip since it allows its user to hold a variety of everyday objects such as a fork or a pen.

- Pinch: This also happens when the thumb is in the opposition position, but it is necessary for the thumb to be manually repositioned by a technician so that only the index finger meets the thumb when the hand is closed. Indeed, the thumb is equipped with an adjustment device that allows it to be repositioned according to the desired grips. The pivot is actually equipped with a screw that once slightly unscrewed allows a small movement of the thumb. Smaller objects, such as a coin, can then be handled.

== Bebionic 2.0 ==
In September 2011, the Bebionic second-generation prosthetic hand saw improvements to speed, accuracy, grip and durability, later becoming available in different size options making this prosthetic available to a broader range of patients. Since its initial upgrade, patients fitted with the Bebionic 2.0 have seen many improvements in the form of high-capacity 2200mAh split cell internal batteries for increased usage time, gains in natural range of motion, increased accuracy in touch sensitivity sensors, and numerous software upgrades, all of which have played a major role in providing a higher quality of life for those that benefit from this technology.

== Patients ==
In 2008, Jonathan Metz from West Hartford, Connecticut got his arm wedged in his basement furnace. Trapped in his own basement for three days, he had no alternative to self-amputating his arm. Since receiving a Bebionic prosthetic hand in 2010, his life has dramatically improved.

In 2012, Kingston upon Hull resident Mike Swainger was the first person to receive a bionic hand on the NHS.

In 2015, Nicky Ashwell, a 26-year-old London-based woman who was born without a right hand, received Bebionic's prosthetic hand.

In 2017, Margarita Gracheva from Serpukhov had her hands cut off by her husband. After six months of rehabilitation, dozens of concerned viewers of Andrey Malakhov's live program on the Russia 1 TV channel helped raise money for a Bebionic prosthetic hand.

== Pop culture ==
In the world of science fiction, the Bebionic hand has been compared to the artificial hands of fictional characters such as The Terminator and Luke Skywalker from Star Wars.
