= Alpha (robot) =

Early British humanoid robot

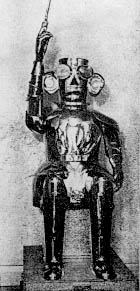
- Robot Alpha in 1934
- Inventor: Harry May
- Country: United Kingdom
- Year of creation: 1934
- Type: Humanoid robot

Alpha was an early British humanoid robot created by inventor Harry May in 1932. The robot was exhibited at the London Radio Exhibition at Olympia as part of a publicity display for the Mullard Valve Company.

Alpha was among several notable humanoid robots demonstrated during the interwar period, following earlier machines such as Eric. The robot became known for its public demonstrations, including responding to voice commands, moving its arms and head, answering prepared questions, and firing a revolver as part of stage performances.

== History ==
Alpha was developed by British inventor Harry May during the early 1930s. The robot was constructed with a chromium-plated steel exterior and stood approximately 6 feet 4 inches (1.93 m) tall. Contemporary reports described Alpha as being capable of standing, sitting, turning its head, raising its arms, and replying to spoken questions.

The robot first gained attention at the 1932 London Radio Exhibition at Olympia, where it appeared on the Mullard stand promoting thermionic valve technology. The demonstrations were largely theatrical and involved concealed operators and prerecorded responses.

May later toured with Alpha internationally, including exhibitions in Canada and the United States. In 1934, the robot appeared at R. H. Macy & Co. in New York City.

== Alleged shooting incident ==
Alpha became the subject of sensational newspaper coverage in 1932 after reports claimed that the robot had shot and injured Harry May during a demonstration in Brighton, England.

According to widely circulated accounts, Alpha unexpectedly rose from its chair and fired a revolver before May had issued the intended command. Later research suggested that many details of the incident were exaggerated by newspapers and that the injury may instead have resulted from an accidental discharge while the weapon was being loaded.

The story became an early example of public anxiety surrounding automation and humanoid machines during the Great Depression era.

== Legacy ==
Alpha is regarded as one of the notable humanoid exhibition robots of the early twentieth century. Historians of technology have cited the machine as an example of how robots were presented as both entertainment and symbols of technological progress during the interwar years.

Photographs and footage of Alpha have continued to circulate in retrospectives on early robotics and retrofuturism.

A demonstration video of Alpha with its inventor survives and has been published on YouTube under the title ''Alpha The Robot (1934)''.

== See also ==
- Eric (robot)
- Elektro
- History of robots
