= Michelangelo Hand =

Robotic hand prosthesis

The Michelangelo Hand is a fully articulated robotic hand prosthesis developed by the German prosthetics company Ottobock and its American partner Advanced Arm Dynamics. It is the first prosthesis to feature an electronically actuated thumb which mimics natural human hand movements. The Michelangelo Hand can be used for a variety of delicate everyday tasks, was first fitted to an Austrian elective-amputee in July 2010 and has been in use by military and civilian amputees in the United States and United Kingdom since 2011.

== Design and development ==
The Michelangelo Hand's development was begun by the German prosthetics manufacturer Ottobock. In 2008, the American company Advanced Arm Dynamics became involved with testing and further refinement of the prosthesis.

The prosthesis is battery-powered and can be used for up to 20 hours between charges. Constructed of metal and plastic, it is designed with a natural, anthropomorphic aesthetic, and can be custom-fitted for each user. Its motions are controlled by built-in electrodes, which detect the movements of the user's remaining arm muscles and interpret them using electromyography software. The fingers can form numerous naturalistic configurations to hold, grip or pinch objects. The Michelangelo Hand is capable of moving with enough precision to conduct delicate tasks such as cooking, ironing, and opening a toothpaste tube, but can also exert enough strength to use an automobile's steering wheel. Skin-toned cosmetic gloves are also available for the prosthesis. In 2013, the Michelangelo Hand had a unit cost of around £47,000 (US$73,800).

== Users ==
Austrian electrician Patrick Mayrhofer suffered serious injuries to his hands at the age of 20 when he touched a 6000-volt power line in February 2008. After unsuccessful attempts to reconstruct his left hand, it was amputated below the elbow in July 2010 and he became the first patient in the world to be fitted with a Michelangelo Hand. He joined Ottobock 3 years later, helping their customers learn to use their prostheses. Having started para-snowboarding in 2012, Mayrhofer was named Paralympic Austrian Sports Personality of the Year after winning a gold medal in banked slalom at the 2015 Para-Snowboard World Championships He went on to win the Paralympic silver medal in banked slalom at the 2018 Winter Olympics.

Numerous American soldiers who suffered limb amputation in combat have received Michelangelo Hands since 2011. In January 2012, Matt Rezink of Wisconsin became the first American civilian to receive a unit. In January 2013, Chris Taylor, a British service engineer who had lost his right hand in a jet ski accident in 2009, became the first UK citizen to be fitted with a Michelangelo Hand. By 2013, the hand was offered by several British prosthetic services companies, including Dorset Orthopaedic.

== See also ==
- Boston Digital Arm, an American manufacturer of powered prostheses
