= Reinforcement in concrete 3D printing =

The reinforcement of 3D printed concrete is a mechanism where the ductility and tensile strength of printed concrete are improved using various reinforcing techniques, including reinforcing bars, meshes, fibers, or cables. The reinforcement of 3D printed concrete is important for the large-scale use of the new technology, like in the case of ordinary concrete. With a multitude of additive manufacturing application in the concrete construction industry—specifically the use of additively constructed concrete in the manufacture of structural concrete elements—the reinforcement and anchorage technologies vary significantly. Even for non-structural elements, the use of non-structural reinforcement such as fiber reinforcement is not uncommon. The lack of formwork in most 3D printed concrete makes the installation of reinforcement complicated. Early phases of research in concrete 3D printing primarily focused on developing the material technologies of the cementitious/concrete mixes. These causes combined with the non-existence of codal provisions on reinforcement and anchorage for printed elements speak for the limited awareness and the usage of the various reinforcement techniques in additive manufacturing. The material extrusion-based printing of concrete is currently favorable both in terms of availability of technology and of the cost-effectiveness. Therefore, most of the reinforcement techniques developed or currently under development are suitable to the extrusion-based 3D printing technology.

== Types of reinforcement ==
The reinforcement in concrete 3D printing, much like that in conventional concrete, can be classified based either on the method of placement or the method of action. The methods of placement of reinforcement are preinstallation, co-installation, and post-installation. The examples of each are pre-installed meshes, fibers mixed with concrete, and post-tensioning cables, respectively. The classification based on the structural action is once again the same as that in conventional concrete. Examples of active and passive reinforcement in 3D printed concrete are reinforcement bars and post-tensioning cables used to prestress segmental elements, respectively. The majority of the reinforcement in concrete has conventionally been steel and continues to be even in 3D printed concrete. Alternate composite materials such as FRPs and fibers of glass, basalt etc., in the mix have gained considerable prominence.

== Some common reinforcements in 3D printing ==
=== Reinforcing steel bars ===
The high availability and popularity of deformed bars or rebars as a passive structural reinforcement in conventional concrete systems make it sought after in printed concrete. They are welded together to form trusses laid between layers to form a very effective co-installed reinforcement strategy without the use of formworks. They are erected to reinforce cages around which concrete is printed to form wall and beam elements, making rebars an effective pre-installment strategy.

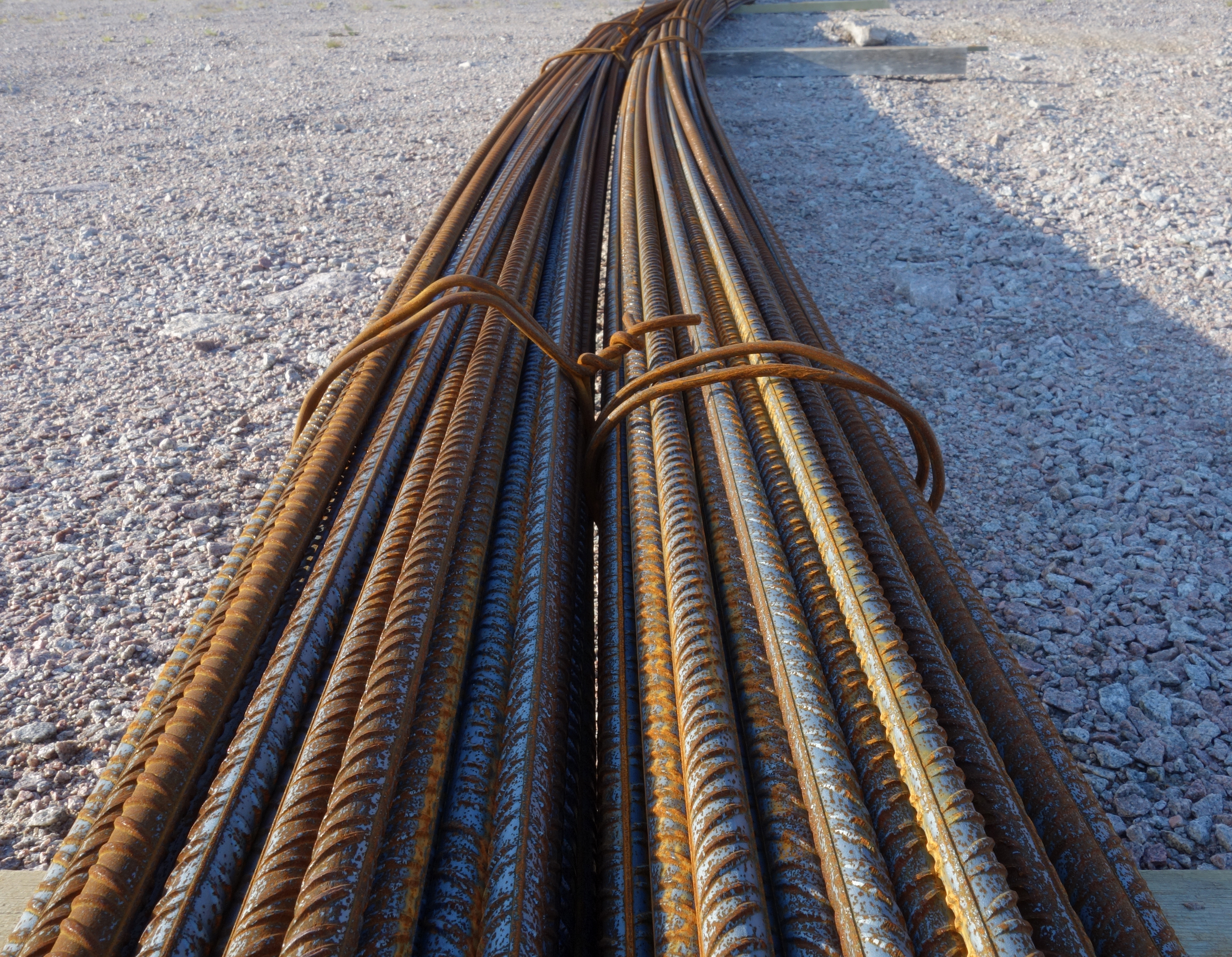
A bunch of rebars

The rebar-based formative skeletal structure can also act as a core on which printable concrete is shotcreted in a new method developed at TU Braunschweig.

The rebar cages can also be installed inside printed concrete formworks in non-structural members, and the holes are filled with grout. This method of post-installed reinforcement has proven to be cost-effective; however, it requires attention to the interface between steel and the printed concrete. The use of printed concrete as formwork requires higher tensile hoop strength of the concrete, which could be provided by the use of fibers in the mix.

==== Smart Dynamic Casting ====
Smart Dynamic Casting (SDC), a new printing technology being developed in ETH Zurich, combines slipforming and printing material technologies to produce varied cross-sections and complex geometries using very little formwork. Reinforcement bars are pre-installed, just like in the case of conventionally cast concrete, and the rheology of the concrete is adapted to retain the shape of the slipforming formwork before concrete hydrates enough to sustain self-weight. Concrete facade mullions of varying cross-sections are produced for a DFAB house in Switzerland.

=== Reinforcement meshes ===
Similar to the use of rebars, reinforcement meshes are also used popularly as a passive reinforcement technique. The welded wire meshes are laid in-between printed layers of slabs without requiring any formwork. They can also be used to print wall elements that are fabricated laterally and erected in place. In a method unlike with rebars, spools of meshes are unwound simultaneously ahead of the printer nozzle to provide both horizontal and vertical reinforcement to the printed elements. This method not only acts as reinforcement in the hardened state of concrete but also compensates for the lack of formwork in the fresh state of concrete.

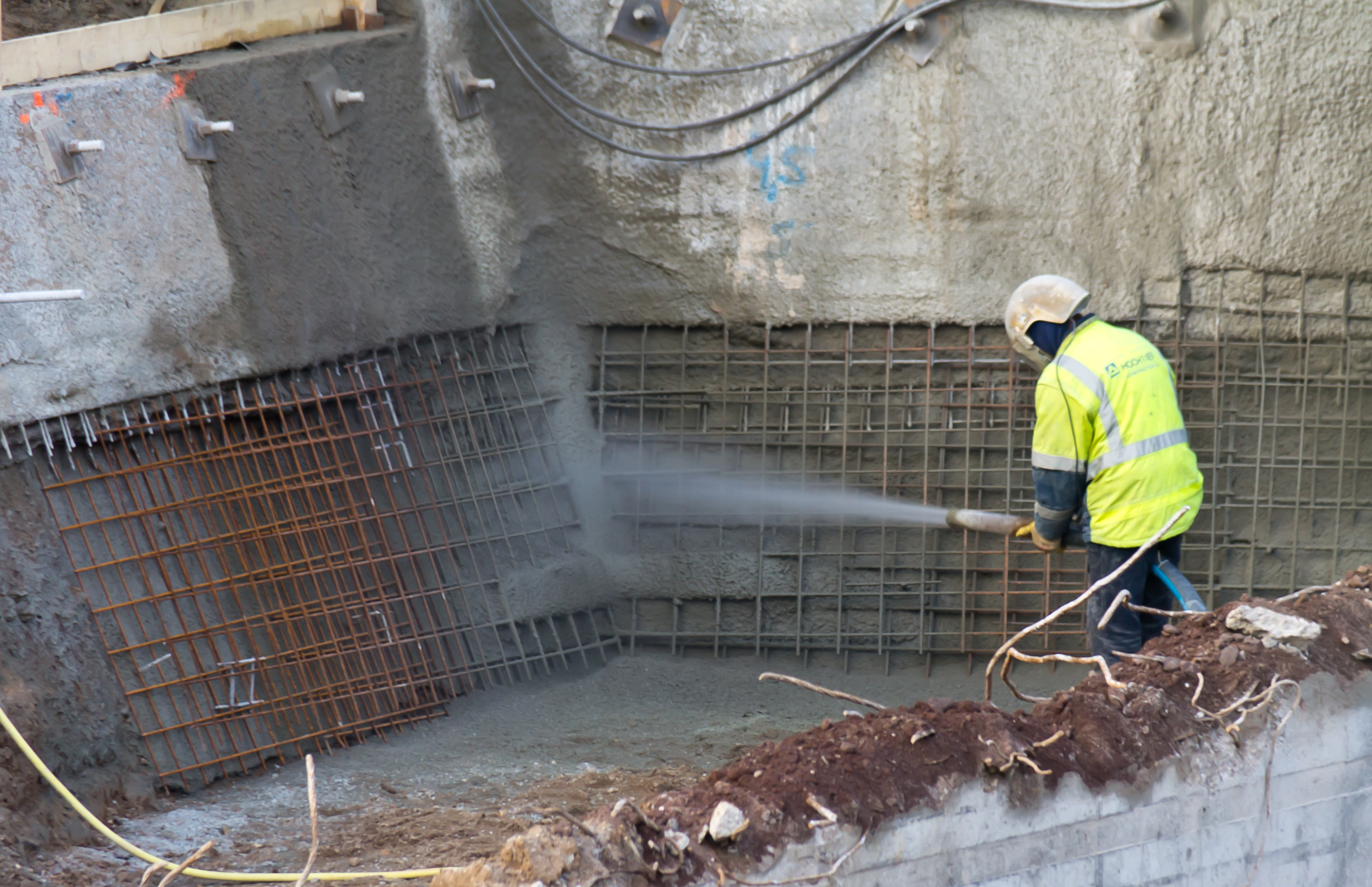
A building worker is spraying shotcrete on welded wire mesh

=== Cables ===
High-strength galvanised steel cables provide effective reinforcement in printed concrete elements where sufficient cover concrete cannot be provided owing to the complexity of the shape. The cables can either be laid in-between layers or extruded simultaneously like the meshes. The bond between high-strength steel cables and concrete needs special attention.

==== Continuous yarn or Flow-based Pultrusion ====
Continuous yarn in Glass, Basalt, High-performance Polymer or carbon can also effectively be used as reinforcement for 3D-printed concrete without needing additional motors. The technique takes advantage of the extruded concrete consistency to passively pultrude numerous continuous yarns. The obtained material is a unidirectional cementitious composite with an increase in strength and ductility in the extrusion direction depending on the proportion of fiber. Thanks to the small diameter of the yarn used, their bond with the matrix is usually great. Furthermore, the process takes advantage of the small bending stiffness of the yarn to ensure the same geometric freedom with extended buildability possibilities thanks to the early traction strength provided by the yarn during the printing. This feature comes with a more complex extrusion nozzle and the use of a specific device for handling the numerous yarns.

==== Post-tensioning cables ====
The automated fabrication of elements realises its true potential when printed segmental elements are fit in place using post-tensioning. The concrete segments are printed, leaving holes for the post-tensioning cables that not only act as an active reinforcement but also help in connecting the segmental elements to form a load-bearing structure. The holes left behind for the cables are filled with grout post the tensioning of the cables. A bicycle bridge has been constructed in TU Eindhoven by printing segments that are post-tensioned using high-strength cables running perpendicular to the printing direction. The post-tensioning technology has a lot of potential as a reinforcement strategy in additively manufactured concrete systems.

=== Fiber reinforcement ===
The use of fibers in the mix has several advantages like in the case of conventional concrete. The higher cement content and faster hydration rate requirements of printed concrete make it susceptible to shrinkage cracking and thermal stresses. The use of fibers (structural or non-structural) can counter these significantly. Fiber reinforcements are also useful in printing shell structures as the tensile membrane action required to convert bending moment into axial force is possible only with tough and high stiffness concrete. Fibers, when aligned can provide this required higher toughness and stiffness. The flexural tensile strength is also improved with the addition of structural steel or PVA fibers. These properties make the fiber-reinforced concrete a suitable material for printing formworks. The cohesiveness of concrete in the fresh state, which is crucial for printing, can be improved by using non-structural fibers such as polypropylene or basalt. The use of fiber reinforcement in 3D printing creates a much-needed segway into the fields of ultra-high performance concretes with enhanced strengths and durability, crucial in aesthetic slender elements.

=== External anchor connectors ===
Anchor connectors are installed in truss elements with the aim of connecting them to similar units using exposed threaded bars. This reinforcing technique has the advantage of faster fabrication of lightweight units that can be arranged in a free-form manner on-site, depending on the requirement. The exposed reinforcement might face corrosion issues when installed in outdoor environments. Topologically optimised truss shapes with force-follows-form can be created and used to save material and, in turn, the construction costs. The anchors can be connected both by in-plane and out-of-plane threaded rebars to create elements beyond simple beams and arches.

=== Bamboo Reinforcement ===
Bamboo reinforcement, including bamboo wrapped in steel wires has been proposed as reinforcement for traditional concrete elements as early as 2005, with recent studies suggesting possible applications in 3D-printed concrete. This technique has the advantage of producing potentially 50 times less carbon emissions than traditional steel reinforcement techniques. One drawback of this method is potential durability issues, as the organic nature of bamboo makes it vulnerable to pests and decomposition. Proper treatment of the material can circumvent this issue, and can preserve the bamboo reinforcement for as long as 15 years.

=== Other less common reinforcement techniques ===
Interface ties and staples are sometimes used to improve the bonding between printed layers. Ladder wire is used to reinforce printed elements to improve horizontal bending. Print stabilisers are used to prevent the elastic buckling of printed layers during the printing process. Welded/printed reinforcement is a technology being developed at TU Braunschweig where the steel reinforcements are simultaneously printed using gas metal arc welding.

=== Hybrid solutions ===
Each reinforcement technology is usually more effective when used in conjuncture with another reinforcing technology, leaving a lot of scope for research and development. The mesh mould technology can be combined with SDC to produce highly automated elements faster. The printable Fiber Reinforced Concrete (FRC) technology can be combined with most other reinforcement techniques seamlessly to produce a highly durable concrete structure. Fiber-reinforced concrete, when used to print formwork, has a higher resistance to hoop stresses owing to higher filament strengths. The meshes and bar cages are almost always combined in the usage of large-scale construction projects.

== See also ==
- Construction 3D printing
- Applications of 3D printing
- Reinforced concrete
- Types of concrete
- 3D printing
- Automation
