= ANYbotics =

Swiss robotic company

- Type: Private
- Industry: Robotics; Artificial intelligence Automation
- Founded: 2016; 10 years ago
- Founders: Péter Fankhauser; Hanspeter Fässler
- Headquarters: Zürich, Switzerland, Switzerland
- Products: ANYmal
- Number of employees: 150
- Website: www.anybotics.com

ANYbotics AG is a robot manufacturer based in Zürich, Switzerland.

== History ==
ANYbotics was founded in 2016 as a spin-off from ETH Zurich's research in quadrupedal robotics. It was co-founded by Péter Fankhauser and Hanspeter Fässler.

In May 2023, ANYbotics received an investment of $50 million in Series B funding round.

ANYbotics is known for developing a quadruped robot named ANYmal. The robot has been used in multiple applications including in chemical, mining, oil and gas operations for inspection purposes. Additionally, it has been used in research facilities as well such as ETH Zurich and the University of Oxford.

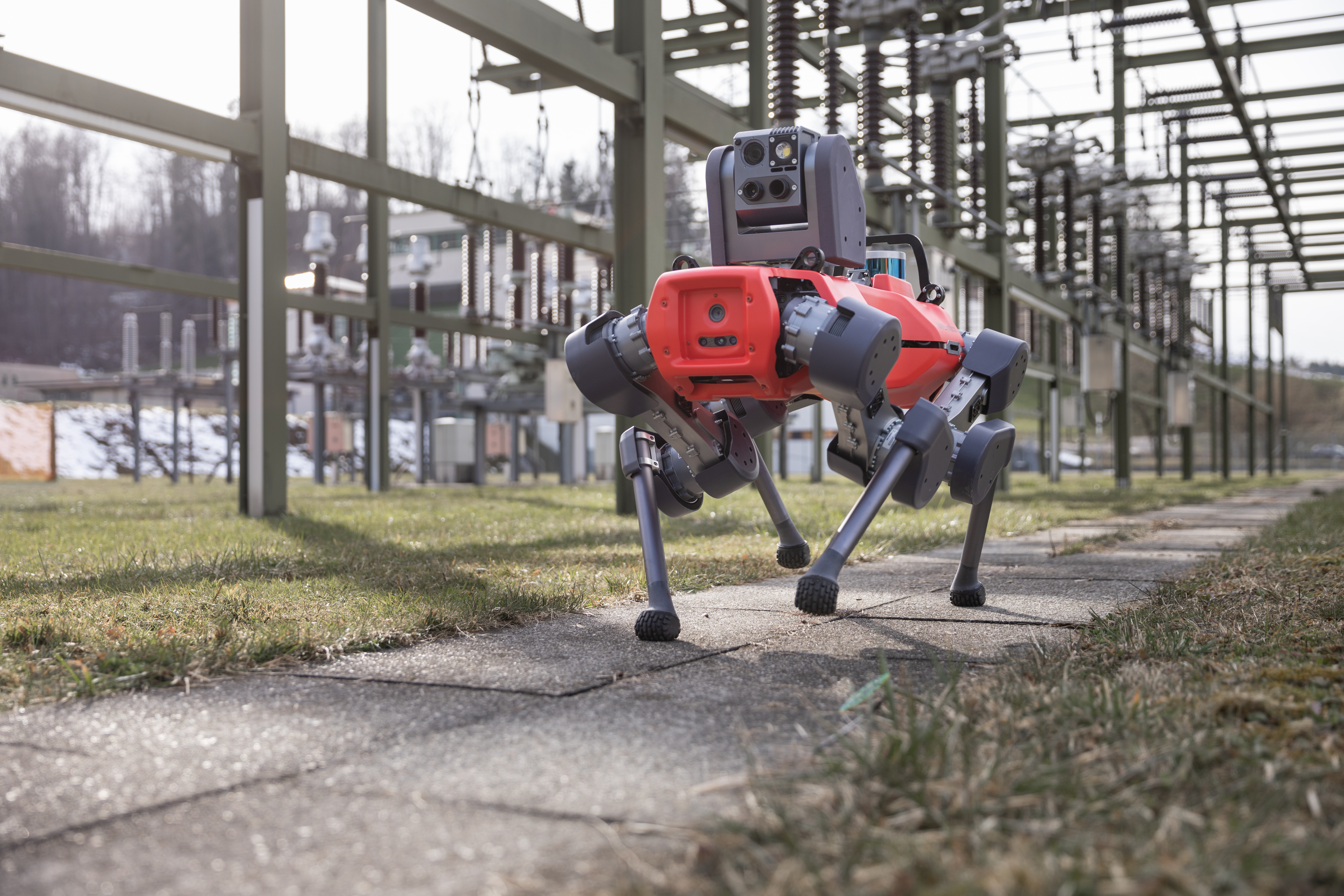
An ANYmal D is walking around in a substation to do visual, thermal, and acoustic inspections daily to ensure asset health.

== Robots ==
- ANYmal

== Awards and recognition ==
- 2022: IEEE Robotics and Automation Award for Product Innovation

== See also ==
- List of robotic dogs
