= Torquing Zano =

Failed Kickstarter project

The Zano was a failed Kickstarter project created by Torquing Group to create a remote-control quadcopter drone with a high-definition camera. After receiving over three million dollars from crowdfunding on Kickstarter, the team was unable to create a product that matched their original description, and eventually filed for bankruptcy after delivering around 600 partially functional drones. Noted as one of the first high-profile Kickstarter failures, the collapse of the Zano prompted Kickstarter to hire an investigative reporter to evaluate why the project failed.

== Kickstarter campaign ==
In a Kickstarter campaign that lasted from 24 November 2014 to 8 January 2015, the Zano received £2,335,119 in funding against a goal of £125,000. The Zano project drew much public attention, dubbed "Europe's largest Kickstarter" and named a Kickstarter "staff pick" and later listed by Popular Science as one of 2015's 100 most amazing innovations.

== Failure ==
Torquing CEO Ivan Reedman resigned on 10 November 2015, prompting tech news site Ars Technica to suggest that Torquing was "in crisis mode and may be on the verge of collapse". Ars had earlier expressed skepticism of the project in May, questioning whether Torquing had the necessary technical knowledge and capabilities to deliver on their claims. Reedman publicly posted that he had left the company due to "personal health issues and irreconcilable differences". On 18 November, Ars reported that the startup had collapsed. Torquing had shipped only 600 of the 15,000 orders, though Mark Harris later confirmed that only 4 units were ever delivered to Kickstarter backers, the rest going to customers who had pre-ordered the drone after the Kickstarter campaign ended. A Kickstarter update posted by Torquing on 24 November 2015 apologized for disappointing backers and detailed an "unaudited" breakdown of their expenditures over the course of the year.

== Investigation ==
Journalist Mark Harris was hired by Kickstarter to investigate the project failure. In a report totaling over 13,000 words, he concluded that Torquing Group "did mount a serious, well-intentioned campaign to develop, manufacture, and deliver" the drones, but did not have the experience or resources to create the promised product. He found "convincing evidence" that demonstration videos on Kickstarter were faked.

== See also ==
- Lily Robotics, Inc. – Another quadcopter/camera drone project that failed without delivering the end product.
