= Luyten 3D =

Australian manufacturer of 3D printers

Luyten 3d
- Industry: Industry Robotics, 3D Printing
- Founded: 2020
- Founder: Ahmed Mahil; Godfrey Keung; Michael Stanley; Shaun Heap
- Headquarters: Melbourne, Australia
- Website: www.luyten3d.com

Luyten 3d is an Australian, Melbourne based, robotics and 3D printers manufacturing company, that designs and manufactures AI mobile 3D printers and 3D printing mix for the building and construction industry.

== History ==
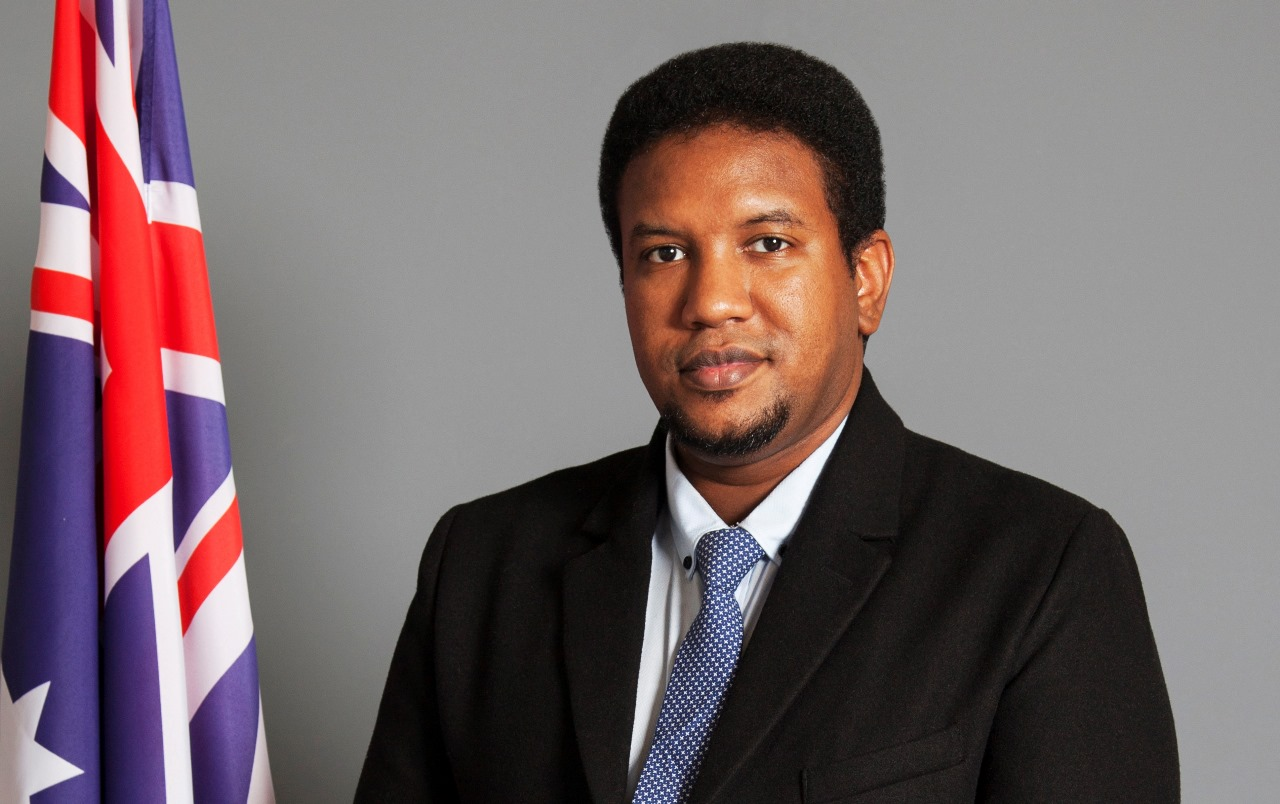
Ahmed Mahil, CEO and Global president of Luyten 3D

Luyten 3D was founded in 2020, by Ahmed Mahil, Godfrey Keung, Michael Stanley, and Shaun Heap.

In 2021 Luyten 3D developed the first mobile robotic gantry style 3D Concrete Printer in Australia and the Southern Hemisphere, named the PLATYPUS.

In 2021, Luyten 3D, collaborated with the University of New South Wales (UNSW) designed and built the 3D-printed house called the ‘Heptapod’ in Melbourne, Australia. This marked the first building code-compliant 3D-printed home in the Southern Hemisphere, with the structure requiring two days for printing and one additional day for assembly of the printed elements. The printed elements gained sufficient strength after 5 hours, resulting in significant reductions in production time and up to 80% savings in labor costs.

In 2022, Luyten 3D collaborated with UNSW to develop a 3D printer and 3D printing mix to print lunar accommodations on the moon as part of Project Meeka. The project aimed to address two critical challenges in lunar construction: materials and lightweight building tools. Led by architectural designer Brandon Nelson, the project proposed high-strength cylindrical structures specifically engineered to withstand the harsh lunar environment through extensive simulation testing. Academic analysis has noted that while Luyten's approach proposes using platforms and printers similar to terrestrial ones, this is one of several proposed methods for lunar construction, with some researchers questioning whether Earth-like printing platforms are optimal for lunar conditions. The project represented part of a broader trend of startup companies entering the space exploration sector, with Luyten adapting its terrestrial construction technology for lunar applications.

In 2023, Luyten 3D and UNSW received an Australian federal government $2.9 million CRC-P grant for the development of affordable and sustainable 3D printed housing. The collaboration included Hanson Construction Materials and focused specifically on developing 3D printed houses for remote Australian mining and other communities.

In 2023, Luyten 3D partnered with US based company Alquist 3D, to provide them with its proprietary 3D concrete mix Ultimatecrete, for the printing of houses in the United States and Canada.

Luyten 3D Printed the first Indigenous Housing Home in the world, located in Melbourne in partnership with Aboriginal Housing Corporation Ilpye Ilpye in 2023. The project, located in the Northern Territory, was designed to withstand extreme climate conditions using Luyten's proprietary Ultimatecrete material. The company has set a goal to construct 30% of housing in Australia's regional areas using 3D printing technology by 2030.

In 2024, Luyten 3D demonstrated construction of a fully functional two storey house in 32 hours, using its Platypus X12 3D printer.

== See also ==
- 3D Printing Process
