= Tally (robot) =

Robot

- Tally 4 scanning robot at a Fred Meyer
- Manufacturer: Simbe
- Inventor: Simbe
- Country: United States
- Year of creation: 2015
- Purpose: Retail

Tally is a robot to assist with stocking and maintaining store shelves at retail locations. The robot has cameras and sensors to determine if products on store shelves are out-of-stock, misplaced, or mispriced. It was created by Simbe in 2015.

== Tally ==
Tally is the first autonomous mobile robot to assist with stocking and maintaining store shelves. It was first introduced in 2015. The robot sits on a round platform on wheels. Tally is made from a metal frame with a plastic outer-layer. Tally navigates a retail location based on a map of the store, while taking photos of the shelves. It uses the photos to determine if the products are stocked, in the right place, and properly labeled. It also has sensors to avoid bumping into shoppers.

Tally runs for up to 12 hours on a charge. Once it runs low on power, it navigates back to a base station to charge. Most of the robot's software is based on open source packages, like those from the Robot Operating System (ROS) and Open Computer Vision (OpenCV). The robot takes about one hour to scan all of the shelves of a small store. It views about 15,000 to 30,000 barcodes per-hour. As of 2024, Tally was in use at about 1,000 stores.

== Background ==
Simbe, the manufacturers of Tally, was founded by Brad Bogolea, Mirza Shah, and Jeff Gee in July 2014. Its first release of Tally was in 2015. The company raised $26 million in funding in 2019, $28 million in 2023, and $50 million Series C in 2024. In January 2024, it released an improved version with longer-range vision and the ability to scan taller shelves or pallets, it developed in a partnership with BJ's Wholesale Club for wholesale locations. In October 2024, Simbe released Brand Insights. This allowed retailers to sell data to the brands they carry on things like where the brand's products are located and if they are in stock.

== See also ==
- List of robotics companies
