= List of robotics companies =

A robotics company produces or manufactures and sells robots for domestic or industrial use. In the 21st century, investment in robotics companies has grown due to increasing demand for automation.

These firms specialize in a wide range of applications, from autonomous drones to robots tailored for factory work or warehousing and logistics. Robotics companies may also produce cobots which interact with and collaborate with humans.

== Notable examples by country ==
=== Australia ===
- Fastbrick Robotics

=== Austria ===
- B&R
- Taurob

=== Canada ===
- Attabotics
- Clearpath Robotics
- CRS Robotics
- Kinova
- Robotics Design Inc.
- White Box Robotics

=== China ===
- AgiBot
- CloudMinds
- Deep Robotics
- DJI
- Dobot
- Ecovacs Robotics
- Engine AI
- Flexiv
- Estun Automation
- Fourier (company)
- Geekplus
- Horizon Robotics
- Leju Robot
- Mech-Mind Robotics
- Orbbec
- Roborock
- Shenzhen Picea Robotics
- Siasun Robotics
- Turing Robot
- UBtech Robotics
- Unitree Robotics
- X Square Robot
- Zhiwei Robotics Corp.

=== Croatia ===
- DOK-ING

=== Denmark ===
- Jorgensen Engineering
- Universal Robots
- Welltec

=== Estonia ===
- Cleveron
- Milrem Robotics
- Starship Technologies

=== France ===
- Aldebaran
- Exotec
- Donecle
- Enchanted Tools

=== Germany ===
- Agile Robots SE
- Festo
- Fischertechnik
- Halfmann Teleskoptechnik
- KUKA
- MetraLabs GmbH
- Neura Robotics
- Neurospace
- Reis Robotics
- Rowa Automatisierungssysteme

=== Hong Kong ===
- Hanson Robotics

=== India ===
- Sastra Robotics

=== Israel ===
- Mazor Robotics
- Robomow

=== Italy ===
- Comau
- Makr Shakr

=== Japan ===
- Cyberdyne Inc.
- Denso
- Epson Robots
- FANUC
- Intelligent Actuator
- Kawasaki Heavy Industries
- Mitsubishi Electric
- Murata Machinery
- Nachi-Fujikoshi
- Omron
- Yaskawa Electric Corporation
- ZMP INC.

=== Netherlands ===
- Lely

=== Norway ===
- 1X Technologies
- AutoStore

=== Singapore ===
- Eureka Robotics

=== South Korea ===
- Doosan Robotics
- HD Hyundai Robotics
- Hyundai WIA
- Rainbow Robotics
- Robotis

=== Slovakia ===
- Brightpick

=== Spain ===
- Robotnik Automation

=== Sweden ===
- NDC Netzler & Dahlgren Co AB

=== Switzerland ===
- ANYbotics
- ABB
- Stäubli

=== Taiwan ===
- HIWIN
- Techman
- Thunder Tiger

=== United Kingdom ===
- Academy of Robotics
- Active Robots
- CMR Surgical
- Engineered Arts
- Humanoid
- Moley Robotics
- Open Bionics
- Oxa
- ST Robotics

=== United States ===
- 3D Robotics
- Agility Robotics
- Amazon Robotics
- Anduril Industries
- Anybots
- Apptronik
- Autonomous Solutions
- Barrett Technology
- Berkshire Grey
- Bluefin Robotics
- Bossa Nova Robotics
- Boston Dynamics
- Built Robotics
- Covariant (company)
- Daxbot
- Double Robotics
- Ekso Bionics
- Energid Technologies
- Evolution Robotics
- FarmWise
- Figure AI
- Foster-Miller
- Foundation, Inc.
- Harvest Automation
- Honeybee Robotics
- Intuitive Surgical
- IRobot
- ISEE
- Knightscope
- Mantis Robotics
- Meka Robotics
- Neato Robotics
- Neocortex AI
- Nuro
- Omron Adept
- Open Robotics
- Palladyne AI
- Perrone Robotics
- Physical Intelligence
- PickNik Robotics
- Posha
- Prioria
- Rethink Robotics
- Robai
- Serve Robotics
- Shield AI
- Skydio
- Sphero
- Starship Technologies
- Stone Aerospace
- Symbotic
- Unimation
- Universal Robotics
- Vecna Robotics
- Willow Garage
- Wolf Robotics
- Wonder Workshop
- Zipline

=== Vietnam ===
- TOSY

== See also ==
- List of artificial intelligence companies
- List of roboticists
- List of robotics laboratories
- List of robotics occupations
- List of robotics software
- List of robots
- Robotics
- Robotics (disambiguation)
- Glossary of robotics
