= Siasun Robotics =

Chinese robotics manufacturer

Siasun Robot and Automation Company Limited
- Native name: 新松机器人自动化股份有限公司
- Company type: Public
- Traded as: SZSE: 300024
- Industry: Machinery
- Founded: 30 April 2000; 26 years ago Shenyang
- Founder: Qu Daokui
- Headquarters: Hunnan District, Shenyang
- Area served: Worldwide
- Key people: Qu Daokui (Founder & CEO)
- Products: Robotic Machinery, Industrial Robotics, AGV, Cobots, Collaborative robot
- Owner: China Academy of Sciences
- Number of employees: 4513
- Subsidiaries: Consultation Consultant Limited Company
- Website: www.siasun.com

Siasun Robot & Automation Co. Ltd., often shortened to Siasun or Siasun Robotics, is one of the largest robotics manufacturers in China. It belongs to the China Academy of Sciences and was founded by its current CEO Qu Daokui in 2000. The company primarily produces robot machinery, usually for industrial purposes. During the 2019-20 coronavirus outbreak, the company received media attention for its donation of robotics to hospitals and the Red Cross in Shenyang.

== History ==
On April 30, 2000, Siasun was founded by Qu Daokui, who was affiliated with the China Academy of Sciences.

By 2016, the company was stated to have registered around 140 inventions every year from 2013 to 2016.

In 2017, Siasun became the first China-based member of the Robotic Industries Association, a United States trade group specifically focused on the robotics industry.

== Operations ==
Despite being one of China's largest robotics manufacturers, the company has sought to expand internationally into other nations. Qu Daokui, the company's founder, stated that "[we] plan to build research and development centers in Europe, North America and Japan to accelerate our overseas expansion". In 2019, Siasun began plans to construct a new manufacturing plant in Thailand, which was hoped to continue the development of Thailand's Eastern Economic Corridor.

The company plans to utilize 5G, object avoidance, and other new technologies with its robots for services such as human-computer interaction, facial recognition, and information inquiry devices.

=== 2019-20 coronavirus outbreak ===
During the 2019-20 coronavirus outbreak, Siasun donated 21 robots and 10 electric adjustable beds to hospitals in Shenyang. Out of this, seven robots were donated to the Red Cross in Shenyang.

== Products ==
Industrial Robot

- SR6C/SR10C - SIASUN 6-axis flexible industrial robot with a safe and streamlined design. The body is lightweight, compact, and the wrist of the hollow structure can effectively use the space dead angle to operate in a narrow area. The robot has high flexibility, safety, high accuracy and other characteristics. It is especially suitable for flexible production line with limited working space, which can meet the requirements of precision assembly, inspection, handling, loading and unloading.
- SR360A/SR10C -SR360A is a harsh TAKT with rapid speed; Networked Control Systems, abundant external interface with high extension capability; Completely open independent control system could support multiple application development; SIASUN Robot Virtual work station support CAD model reconstruction and non-teach job on basis of CAD modeling; Support the information processing of intelligent sensor on vision and force sensation.
- SR4C -SIASUN SR4C robot especially appealing to the electronics industry andeducation industry, is SR4Cis particularly suitable for assembling small components, handling, screw fastening, adhesive bonding, packaging and inspecting.

== Users ==
Siasun has furnished industrial modernization services to over 3,000 global enterprises. Products have been shipped to 32 countries and areas. Formal cooperation was established with 17 countries participating in the Belt & Road. Furthermore, its products have been distributed worldwide to famous automakers and firms, including BMW, Nissan, Ford, General Motors, Sandisk and many other companies.

== See also ==
- CloudMinds
- Ecovacs Robotics
- Hanson Robotics
- ABB
- SZSE 100 Index
