= Construction robots =

Automation in construction

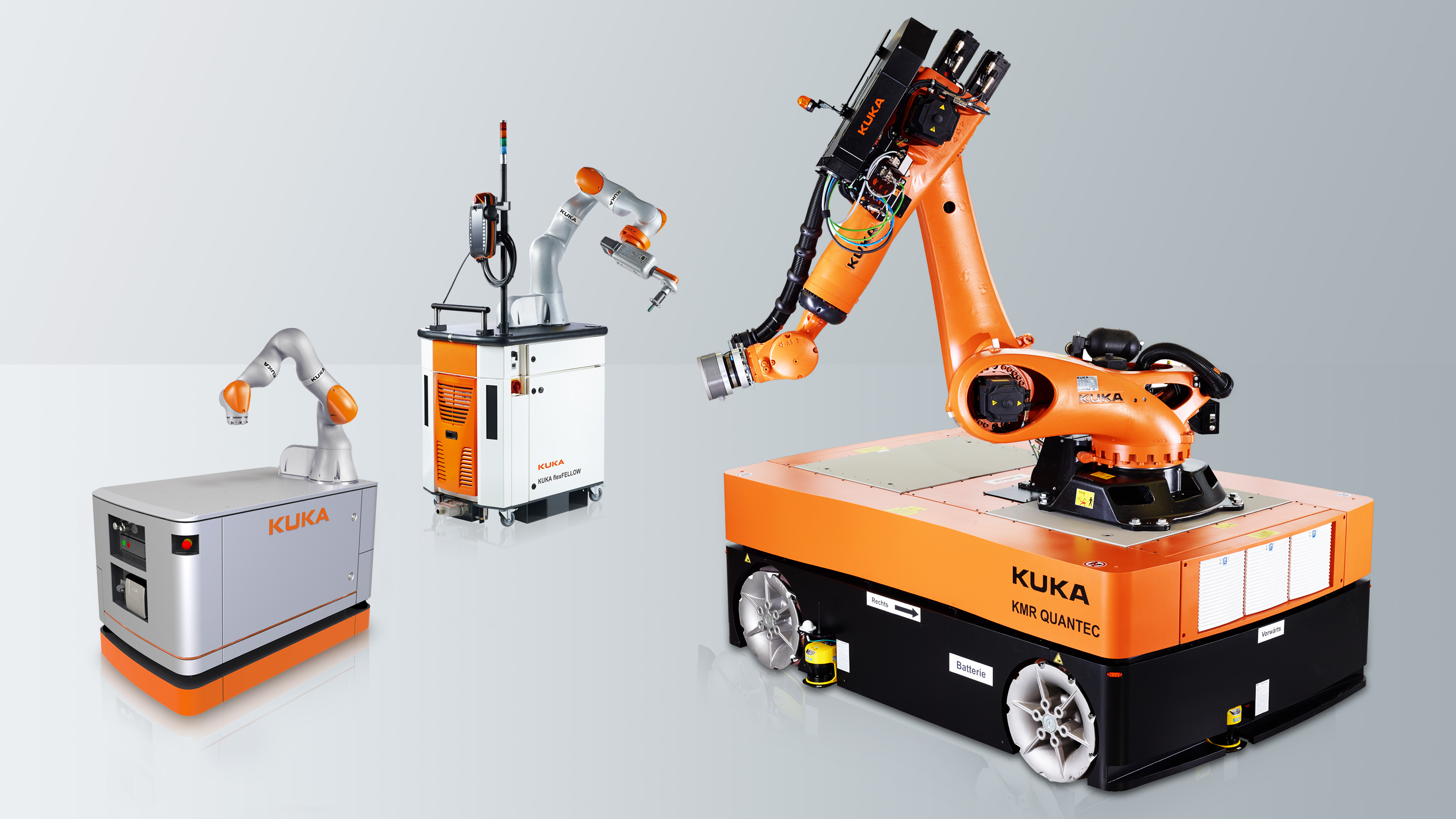

Construction robots are a subset of industrial robots used for building and infrastructure construction on site, or in the production of materials and components offsite.

A 2021 survey said 55% of construction companies in the United States, Europe, and China used robots in some form. This figure, however, reflects reported use across the construction value chain rather than widespread deployment of robots on active construction sites. Real-world adoption remains limited, with many robotic systems confined to pilot projects, controlled environments, or specific task applications rather than continuous on-site construction use.

One of the main challenges in deploying robots on construction sites is the unstructured and variable nature of the environment, which differs fundamentally from controlled factory settings where industrial robots have traditionally operated.

Some robots currently deployed on job sites assist with physically demanding or repetitive tasks: excavating, lifting heavy materials, surveying, laying out markers, tying rebar, and installing drywall. More advanced systems are being developed for exterior finishing, steel placement, masonry, and reinforced concrete work. In practice, rather than autonomous systems performing core building tasks, the most widely adopted robot applications on construction sites involve technologies such as aerial drones (or, less frequently, quadruped robots - for example, Boston Dynamics' Spot - or humanoid robots) used for surveying, inspection, and progress monitoring (the robots typically carry video and/or 360-degree cameras, LiDar scanners or other data capture devices, with data analysed using artificial intelligence and machine learning).

Boston Dynamics 'Spot' quadruped robot

Some emerging systems are designed as multifunctional construction robots, integrating multiple tools and capabilities within a single robotic platform to perform different stages of the construction process. These systems aim to improve operational flexibility and increase automation in complex construction environments.

Experimental projects using robotic construction technologies and additive manufacturing have been demonstrated in several countries as part of broader efforts to industrialize the construction sector and improve productivity through automation and digitalization.

== Features ==
Construction robots are generally required to meet the following criteria:

- Mobility: the ability to navigate around a construction site, including uneven terrain and confined spaces.
- Adaptability: the ability to handle components of variable size, weight, and shape.
- Environmental awareness: the ability to sense and respond to changing on-site conditions.
- Interactivity: the ability to operate alongside human workers and other equipment.
- Multitasking: the ability to perform several different operations within a single deployment.

== Capabilities ==
Construction robots have been developed and tested for a range of on-site tasks, including:

- Progress monitoring — robots equipped with cameras and sensors can track construction progress and identify deviations from plans.
- Inspection — robots are used to investigate infrastructure at dangerous or inaccessible locations, reducing risk to human workers and eliminating human error.
- Wall construction — robotic systems can lay bricks and blocks with greater speed and consistency than manual labour.
- Earthmoving and material handling — autonomous excavators and haul trucks use GPS, lidar, and motion sensors to perform digging, trenching, and loading tasks with minimal human input.
- Grading and dozing — autonomous bulldozers use GPS, gyroscopes, and laser sensors to control blade angle and depth, improving surface finish accuracy and reducing material overuse.
- 3D printing — additive manufacturing systems can construct walls and structural elements directly from digital models.

== Notable construction-related activities undertaken by robots ==
The distribution of robotic applications in construction varies across the project lifecycle. Most applications are concentrated in structural construction tasks such as masonry, concrete work, and assembly, while other phases, including planning, maintenance, and demolition, remain less represented.

=== Automated building systems ===
- The Nisseki Yokohama Building (also known as Rail City Yokohama), a 30-storey office building in Yokohama, Japan, was constructed between 1994 and 1997 using the SMART system (Shimizu Manufacturing system by Advanced Robotics Technology), developed by Shimizu Corporation and a consortium of seven other Japanese companies. The system used automated horizontal hoists and vertical lifts to position steel beams, columns, precast concrete floor slabs, and prefabricated facade panels, with welding robots connecting structural elements under laser-guided precision. Each component was tracked by barcode to monitor progress and coordinate just-in-time delivery of materials.
- Obayashi Corporation developed the Advanced Building Construction System (ABCS), a similar automated platform used in several high-rise projects in Japan in the 1990s, including the NEC Head Office in Kanagawa (1997–2000).

=== Progress monitoring, inspection ===
- Boston Dynamics' Spot was used in February 2024 to inspect sections of the M5 motorway in England for National Highways.
- A £15,000 humanoid robot (a G1 model from Chinese manufacturer Unitree) was deployed to capture 360-degree imagery and progress reports to support health and safety monitoring and reporting for UK contractor Tilbury Douglas in April 2026.
- Also in the UK, McLaren Construction deployed autonomous FieldAI quadruped robots to capture 360° site imagery for safety compliance and quality assurance purposes.
- In the US, Virginia Tech's ARCADE research lab is developing MARIO (Multi-Agent Robotic system for Inspection On-site), a heterogenous robotic system deploying multiple robots capable of different locomotion to perform remote real-time construction progress monitoring in complex construction sites.

=== Earthmoving ===
- Between 2019 and 2021, Mortenson Construction and Black & Veatch were among the first construction contractors to deploy autonomous excavation technology on commercial projects, using systems developed by Built Robotics. Mortenson used the technology for wind turbine foundation excavation in Colorado. Black & Veatch deployed autonomous excavators on a solar energy project in Florida, digging 1,000 linear feet of trenches.
- In 2025, Sundt Construction carried out mass excavation at a 130-acre industrial site in Arizona. Excavators equipped with retrofit kits developed by Bedrock Robotics — comprising LiDAR, cameras, and onboard computing systems — operated autonomously, moving over 65,000 cubic yards of earth and rock. This was described as the industry's largest-known supervised autonomy deployment at the time.

=== Concrete works ===
- Obayashi Corporation developed and deployed a robotic system for placing concrete layers in dam construction in Japan.
- A concrete floor finishing robot was deployed by Kajima and Tokimec in Japan. The MARK series were designed in 1984 to automate the levelling and trowelling of concrete slabs on construction sites, providing consistent finishing accuracy, improved efficiency, and reduced dependence on skilled labour.
- In July 2026, Finnish company Hyperion secured £7m funding for a UK factory at Flixborough where it will deploy AI-powered robots to produce infrastructure components faster and with less CO2 emissions. Target sectors included energy, utilities, water, data centres and carbon capture.

=== Masonry ===
- SAM100 (Semi-Automated Mason), developed by Construction Robotics, is one of the first commercially available bricklaying robots for on-site masonry construction. In 2018, it was used in the construction of the University Arts Building at the University of Nevada, Reno — a $35.5 million facility — where it laid over 60,000 of the 100,000 bricks required, reducing the brick veneer installation time by approximately 50%.
- Hadrian X, developed by the Australian company Fastbrick Robotics, is a fully autonomous mobile bricklaying robot. In November 2022, it completed its first commercial project — five four-bedroom houses in Wellard, Western Australia. In February 2025, PulteGroup, one of the largest homebuilders in the United States, piloted Hadrian X on a site in Florida, constructing an entire house in a single day.

=== 3D printing ===
- In May 2025, a residential building in Arinaga, Gran Canaria, Spain, was completed using 3D printing construction technology, as part of broader efforts to demonstrate robotic and additive manufacturing methods in the housing sector.
- In 2026, a three-storey apartment block in France was constructed using concrete 3D printing technology, three months faster than conventional building methods.
- Finland's Hyperion Robotics has opened a UK factory and used 3D printing with concrete to produce foundations for pipelines and for electricity substation bases, reducing time-consuming and weather-dependent onsite construction processes.

== Social impact ==
The adoption of construction robots varies significantly by region and is shaped by labour market conditions, cultural attitudes, and regulatory frameworks.

In Japan, construction robots have been embraced as a response to an ageing workforce and chronic labour shortages, and are generally viewed positively by the industry.

In the United States, adoption has historically been slower, partly due to resistance from labour unions concerned about job displacement. Research suggests that the impact of automation on workers is uneven: while robots can create a productivity effect that benefits some workers, displacement effects are most pronounced among younger, less-educated workers in manufacturing-heavy regions. More than 60% of construction firms now report difficulty finding skilled operators, which has increased openness to automation as a practical solution to workforce shortages rather than a replacement for workers.

In the UK, during onsite deployment of a humanoid robot for monitoring purposes, there were concerns that staff might think they were being watched ("It's not there to spy on people.... So, we insist that everyone is blurred out. No one wants to feel they’re being spied on by a robot.").

Globally, autonomous construction equipment is increasingly seen as a means of improving worker safety by removing humans from hazardous environments such as steep slopes, confined spaces, and dust-heavy sites.

== See also ==
- Industrial robots
