= Bedrock Robotics =

Autonomous construction technology company

- Type: Private
- Industry: Robotics; Automation in construction; Autonomous vehicles
- Founded: 2024; 2 years ago
- Founders: Boris Sofman; Ajay Gummalla; Kevin Peterson; Tom Eliaz
- Headquarters: San Francisco, California, United States
- Key people: Boris Sofman (CEO); Kevin Peterson (CTO); Laurent Hautefeuille (COO)
- Products: Autonomous retrofit kits for construction equipment
- Website: Official website

Bedrock Robotics is an American company, based in San Francisco, that develops sensor, computing and machine-learning systems to automate heavy construction equipment, beginning with excavators. It was founded in 2024 by former Waymo engineers.

In August 2026, excavators equipped with the company's system were working without an operator in the cab on three commercial sites in Texas and Nevada. Independent observers described the deployments as an early-stage and limited test, noting that their productivity and need for human intervention had yet to be tested across more projects and over longer periods.

== History ==
Bedrock Robotics was founded in 2024 by Boris Sofman, Ajay Gummalla, Kevin Peterson and Tom Eliaz. Three of the four had previously worked at Waymo, where Sofman led the autonomous trucking program and Peterson led perception for that division. Sofman had earlier co-founded the consumer robotics company Anki, which shut down in 2019. Kevin Peterson also previously co-founded Marble, a robotics company acquired by Caterpillar Inc. in 2020.

In July 2025, Bedrock announced $80 million in combined seed and Series A funding led by Eclipse and 8VC; at the time it was testing its system in Arkansas, Arizona, Texas and California with four contractors. In 2026, the company raised $270 million in a Series B round, giving it a valuation of $1.75 billion.

Bedrock began field-testing its system on contractors' projects with human operators driving equipped excavators to collect training data and later with the machines digging autonomously while a safety operator remained in the cab. The company also used a test site at Proto-Town, an industrial campus in Lockhart, Texas. As of December 2025, the system had been installed on excavator models from 20 to 80 tons.

By mid-2026, Bedrock had approximately 50 equipped machines working on projects in six states. In July 2026, a Bedrock-equipped Caterpillar 352 excavator dug to a preset grade and loaded a dump truck for several hours with no one in the cab and no remote intervention; its productivity varied from lower to higher than that of a human operator. In August 2026, excavators using the company's system were operating without onboard operators on three commercial sites in Texas and Nevada.

In October 2026, Bedrock raised $600 million in a Series C round co-led by CapitalG and Emergence Capital, which valued the company at $4.1 billion.

== Technology ==
Bedrock's system, which the company calls the Bedrock Operator, consists of cameras, lidar, GPS receivers and onboard computers added to an excavator, together with machine-learning software. The kit interfaces with the drive-by-wire hydraulic controls used on modern excavators.

When no operator is in the cab, a remote worker monitors several machines and can take control of one that has stalled; the machines stop automatically if a person or unauthorized object comes too close.

== Reception and analysis ==
Independent observers described Bedrock's technology as being in its early stages, limited to no-operator excavators on three sites, and wrote that it was unclear whether autonomous machines could adapt to unpredictable construction sites reliably and cheaply enough for contractors to adopt them.

Vineet Kamat, a professor of construction management at the University of Michigan, called the deployments "a limited test" and said that contractors working on thin margins would need to be sure of a return on investment before spending a few hundred thousand dollars on robotic equipment. Fernanda Leite, a civil engineering professor at the University of Texas at Austin, said she expected sites in the near term to combine highly automated systems with highly skilled workers.

Kurt Knutsson, a columnist for Fox News, wrote that it remained to be seen whether the near-human productivity reported by the company would hold across more job sites, how intervention rates would change as one person monitored a larger fleet and whether the machines could work safely around people over long periods.

=== Regulatory considerations ===
Because the machines operate on private construction sites rather than public roads, Bedrock does not face the same regulatory issues as robotaxis and autonomous trucks. Bryant Walker Smith, an associate professor of law at the University of South Carolina who studies automation, commented that it was unclear how Occupational Safety and Health Administration rules referring to an equipment "operator" would apply when one person remotely monitors several machines and intervenes only when something goes wrong.

== See also ==
- Construction robots
- Automation in construction
- Built Robotics
