= Carl Bass =

Businessperson

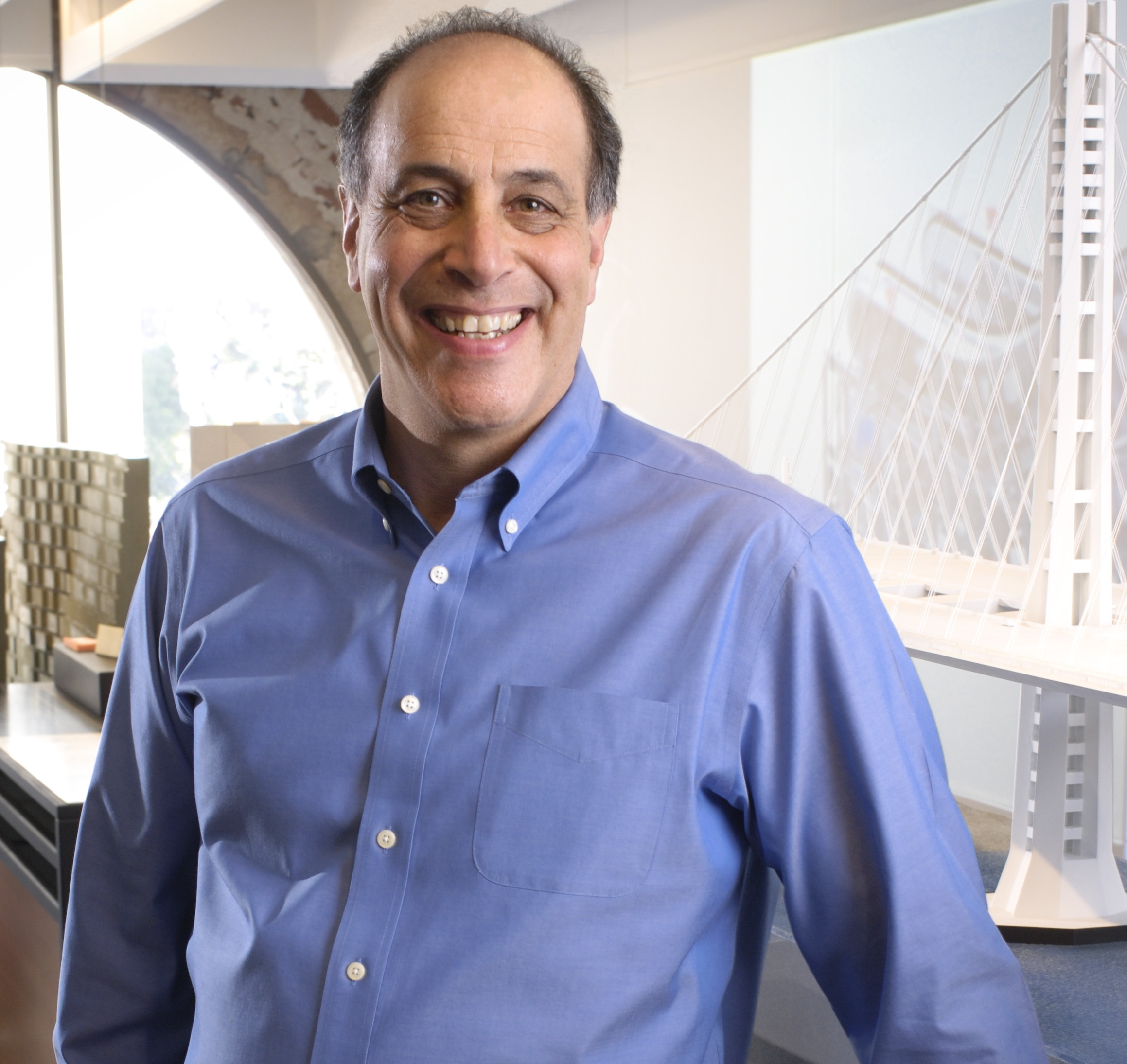
- Bass in February 2009
- Born: May 18, 1957 (age 69); New York City, U.S.
- Education: Cornell University (BA)
- Occupations: Former CEO and President of Autodesk
- Spouse: Daryl Austern

Carl Bass is a former president and chief executive officer of Autodesk, Inc., a maker of professional 3D design software and consumer applications, and was a co-founder of Ithaca Software, which commercialized HOOPS, a 3D graphics system. Bass has been credited with expanding Autodesk beyond its core AutoCAD software through acquisitions and new product developments and transitioning from 2D to 3D model-based design.

== Early life and education ==
Bass was born in New York City, to a chemist father and school teacher mother. After starting at Cornell University, Bass took a break to build boats, furniture, and sculpture in Seattle and Maine for five years. He returned to Cornell and graduated with Bachelor of Arts in mathematics in 1983.

== Career ==
In 1981, Bass co-founded a computer graphics company called Flying Moose Systems and Graphics Ltd., which became Ithaca Software in 1986. The company commercialized HOOPS, a 3D graphics system originally developed at Cornell University in the mid-1980s. Bass served as Ithaca Software’s chief technology officer and CEO. He joined Autodesk when the company acquired Ithaca Software in 1993, serving as the chief architect for AutoCAD. In 1995, Bass was forced out by Autodesk’s then president and CEO Carol Bartz, only to be rehired five months later, after top Autodesk engineers said they needed Bass’s software development skills.

Bass left Autodesk in 1999 to launch Buzzsaw, an online service for management of construction projects, where he served as president and CEO. Bass returned to Autodesk when it acquired the company in 2001. In addition to being the company's president and CEO from 2006 through 2017, Bass held a number of high-level positions at Autodesk, including executive vice president and chief strategy officer (2001 to 2002); senior executive vice president of the Design Solutions Group (2002 to 2004); chief operating officer (2004 to 2006); and interim chief financial officer (2008 to 2009).

== Tenure at Autodesk ==
In 2006, Carol Bartz stepped down as Autodesk’s president and CEO, naming Bass as her replacement.

During his tenure as CEO, Bass focused on expanding the company beyond its core AutoCAD software through acquisitions and new product development, and transitioning from 2D to 3D design. He emphasized vertical markets focusing on model-based design, simulation, and lifecycle management. Under his direction, Autodesk introduced consumer-oriented products such as SketchBook, a mobile painting and drawing app with more than 7 million users as of Nov. 2011. Bass helped lead the company to develop Building Information Modeling (BIM) and generative design technologies. In March 2008, Autodesk was ranked number 25 on Fast Company's list of "The World's 50 Most Innovative Companies."

Bass serves on the Board of Directors of Autodesk, HP Inc., Zendesk Inc., Planet, VELO3D, Formlabs Inc, Box, and Built Robotics. He also serves on the board of trustees of the Smithsonian's Cooper-Hewitt National Design Museum, Art Center College of Design, and California College of the Arts, and is a member of the advisory boards of Cornell Computing and Information Science, UC Berkeley School of Information, and UC Berkeley College of Engineering. He currently acts as an advisor to Zoox Inc. and a special advisor to Alphabet CEO Larry Page.

Bass announced that he would be stepping down as Autodesk's CEO effective on February 8, 2017. He remains a board member and special advisor to the company.

== Personal life ==
Bass owns a workshop near his home in Berkeley, Calif., where he designs and fabricates objects made from wood, metal and stone. Bass’ projects have included furniture, sculpture and a walk-in wooden rocket ship he built for his children, which is on permanent display at Chabot Science Center.
