= Prioria Robotics Maveric =

Discontinued unmanned aerial vehicle (UAV)

Prioria Maveric
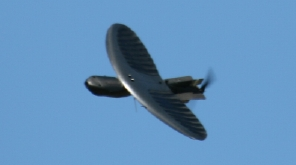
- Maveric UAV in Flight

General information
- Type: Tactical, Squad-level, Hand-launched
- Manufacturer: Prioria Robotics, Inc.

The Prioria Robotics Maveric is a discontinued unmanned aerial vehicle (UAV) marketed as a high-performance, next-generation platform for small and miniature UAV operations. Maveric's bendable wings allow for the ability to store a fully assembled airframe in a 6-inch (150 mm) tube.

== Design ==
Maveric can be deployed immediately with no assembly, with a claimed dash speed of 55 knots (63 mph; 102 km/h). Marketed as the first smart, customizable SUAS, Maveric utilizes Prioria's proprietary processing platform, Merlin.

== Operation ==
Maveric is capable of fully autonomous operation from launch to landing using waypoints, or it can be flown manually by a human pilot via a simple joystick under autopilot assistance.

Maveric was designed for operation by a single user in a military, tactical setting. To accomplish this goal, the airframe had to be small and light enough (2 lb) for a single user to transport, but with large enough wings (28 in) to support the weight of the batteries, cameras, and electronics sufficient for up to one hour of flight-time.

To overcome issues of portability and assembly time, designers employed a bendable-wing design. This design allows for Maveric's wings, which are large enough to meet the desired operational requirements to collapse and wrap around its fuselage and be placed in a 6-inch-diameter (150 mm) tube, while remaining in a fully assembled state. This has two advantages. It allows the aircraft to be stored in a small space, and it makes the aircraft capable of immediate launch on removal from storage. The flexible wings were also claimed to produce a dampening effect called "apative washout" that would allow the UAS to be flown in heavy wind gusts.

The bendable wings and bird-like profile were also claimed to produce an effect of biological camouflage.

== Legal scandal ==
In 2015, Prioria vendor Condor Aerial alleged that Prioria was providing false specifications for the Maveric UAV, selling a hobby-grade drone at a military-grade price and selling refurbished drones as new. The complaint included allegations that the UAV was easily damaged and also consisted of sworn statements by a prior employee who claimed that then-CEO of Prioria was knowingly falsifying information on government contracts. A report by NOAA documented that their own Maveric drones lasted over six years without mechanical incident over the course of 4,500 combined sorties.

Condor won a breach of contract suit with a jury award of $1.5 million on December 7, 2017, and a writ of execution was assessed on Prioria's assets in January 2018. The verdict was appealed, but the company filed for Chapter 11 bankruptcy protection on January 29, 2018, and the appeal has been on hold ever since.

== Former operators ==
- (United States) U.S. Army – 36
- (Canada) Royal Canadian Air Force – 5
- Republic of Singapore Air Force - 20

== See also ==
- Unmanned Aerial Vehicle (UAV)
- Miniature UAV
- Micro Air Vehicle (MAV)
- History of unmanned aerial vehicles
