= Bill Huang =

Chinese businessperson

- 黄晓庆
- Education: Huazhong University of Science & Technology, University of Illinois
- Occupation: Businessperson
- Known for: CloudMinds
- Title: Founder of CloudMinds

Bill Huang (Chinese: 黄晓庆; pinyin: Huáng Xiǎoqìng) is a Chinese businessperson. He was the leader in China Mobile Research Institution in 2007. In 2015, Huang founded CloudMinds Inc.

== Early life and education ==
Bill Huang was born in China. He graduated from Huazhong University of Science & Technology with a bachelor's degree in Electrical Engineering. After 2 years studying at the University of Illinois, he received master's degree in Electrical Engineering and Computer Science.

== Career ==
Huang began his career at Bell Laboratories, where he worked as a researcher. In 1994, he joined Unitech Telecom and became the co-founder of UTStarcom Holdings Corp. a year later. After that, Huang developed the operating system WACOS.

In 1996, Huang put forward the "Network is the Switch" soft switch concept. That same year, he co-established the International Soft switch Consortium (ISC) and developed the first mobile soft switch system in the world and the first carrier-class streaming media exchange and IPTV system.

With the aim to build a research and development center like Bell Labs, Huang joined China Mobile in 2007.

In 2012, Huang created the cloud-based robot system, an architecture for building intelligent robotics system. It contains the idea to split the robot into three parts, cloud, mobile network and terminal.

In 2015, Huang founded CloudMinds Inc., a cloud computing company.

== Awards ==
In 2007, Huang was listed on 100 Most Influential Persons in the Chinese Mobility Industry. In 2016, he received IEEE CQR Chairman's Award, which was the first time that a Chinese CEO to achieve so.
