= LattePanda =

Chinese single-board computer

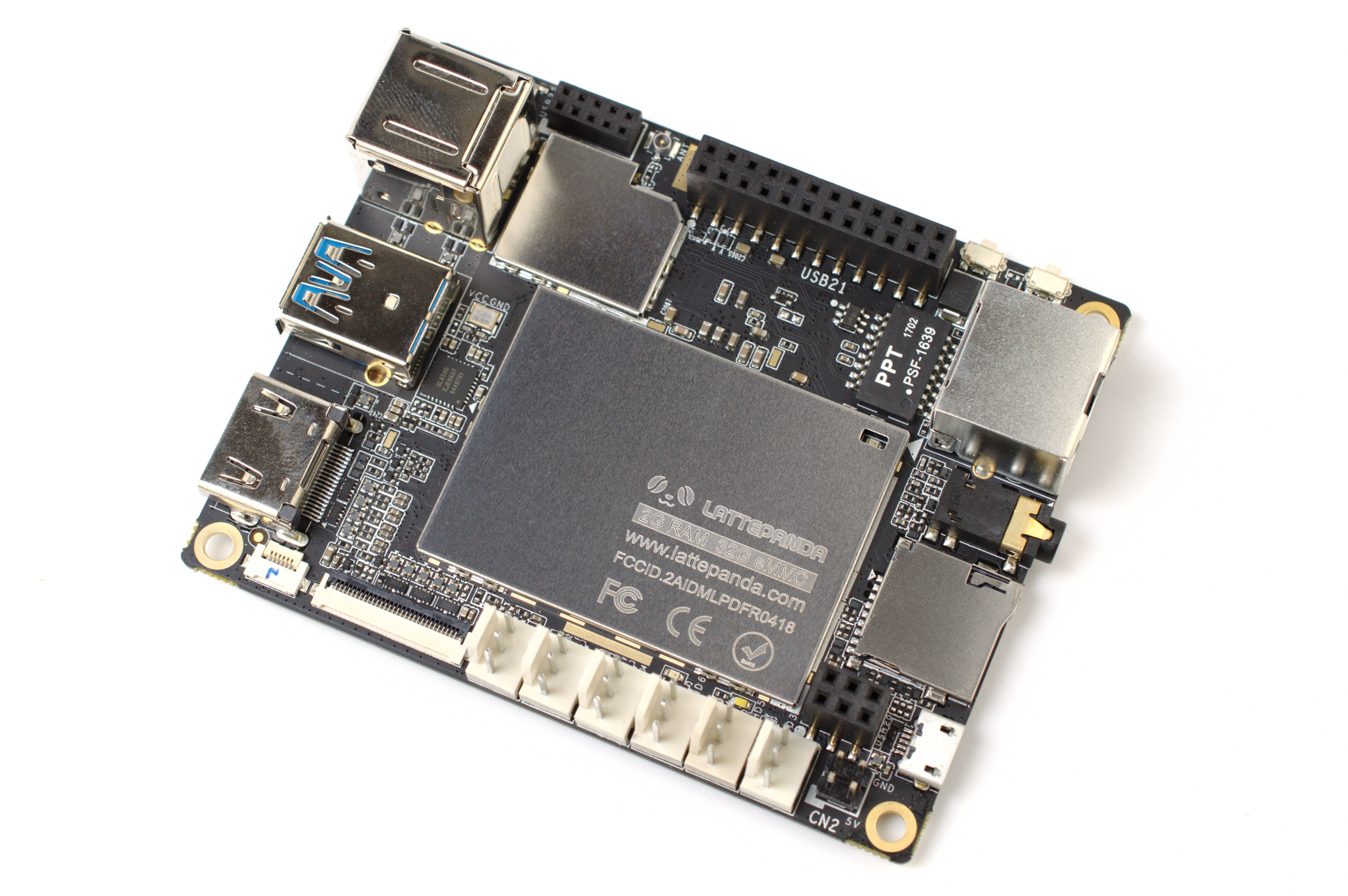
A 2 GB 2018 LattePanda

The LattePanda is a Chinese single-board computer based on x86 architecture developed by DFRobot. It is conceptually similar to the Raspberry Pi, but is significantly more expensive and runs Intel processors instead of ARM. It is capable of running Windows 10 or Linux.

Early versions of the hardware utilized low-power Intel Atom processors. Modern generations have transitioned to more powerful x86 hardware, featuring Intel N-series processors (such as the N100 and N150) for compact models like the Mu and IOTA, and high performance Intel core i5 processors for flagship models like the LattePanda Sigma. Each board also ships with an integrated, dedicated co-processor for managing general-purpose input/output (GPIO) pins, enabling hardware control similar to an Arduino or a Raspberry Pi.

== History ==
The first version of the LattePanda, running Windows 10, was developed by a team in Shanghai through a Kickstarter campaign that began in late 2015. The later versions, Alpha 800 and Alpha 864, added Linux capability. The 864 has a 2.6 GHz Intel Core M3 processor, which is designed for good performance and low power consumption to avoid overheating. It also has 8 GB of onboard RAM and a built-in Intel HD Graphics 615, which can be used to power a 4K display. However, an external GPU can also be added to increase graphics capability.

There is also a dual M.2 connector that allows it to connect to fast NVM Express-based solid-state drive storage, and an array of GPIO headers allowing connection to various peripherals in the same manner as a Raspberry Pi.

The Alpha has similar specifications and capability as a 12-inch MacBook, despite being around $1,000 cheaper ($358 compared to about $1,200). However, it is still substantially more expensive than the Pi.

== Reception ==
The LattePanda has been well-received. Reviewers have found it runs Windows 10 acceptably and is responsive, and can be used for some video editing.
