= Obernburg =

Obernburg a.Main
- Town
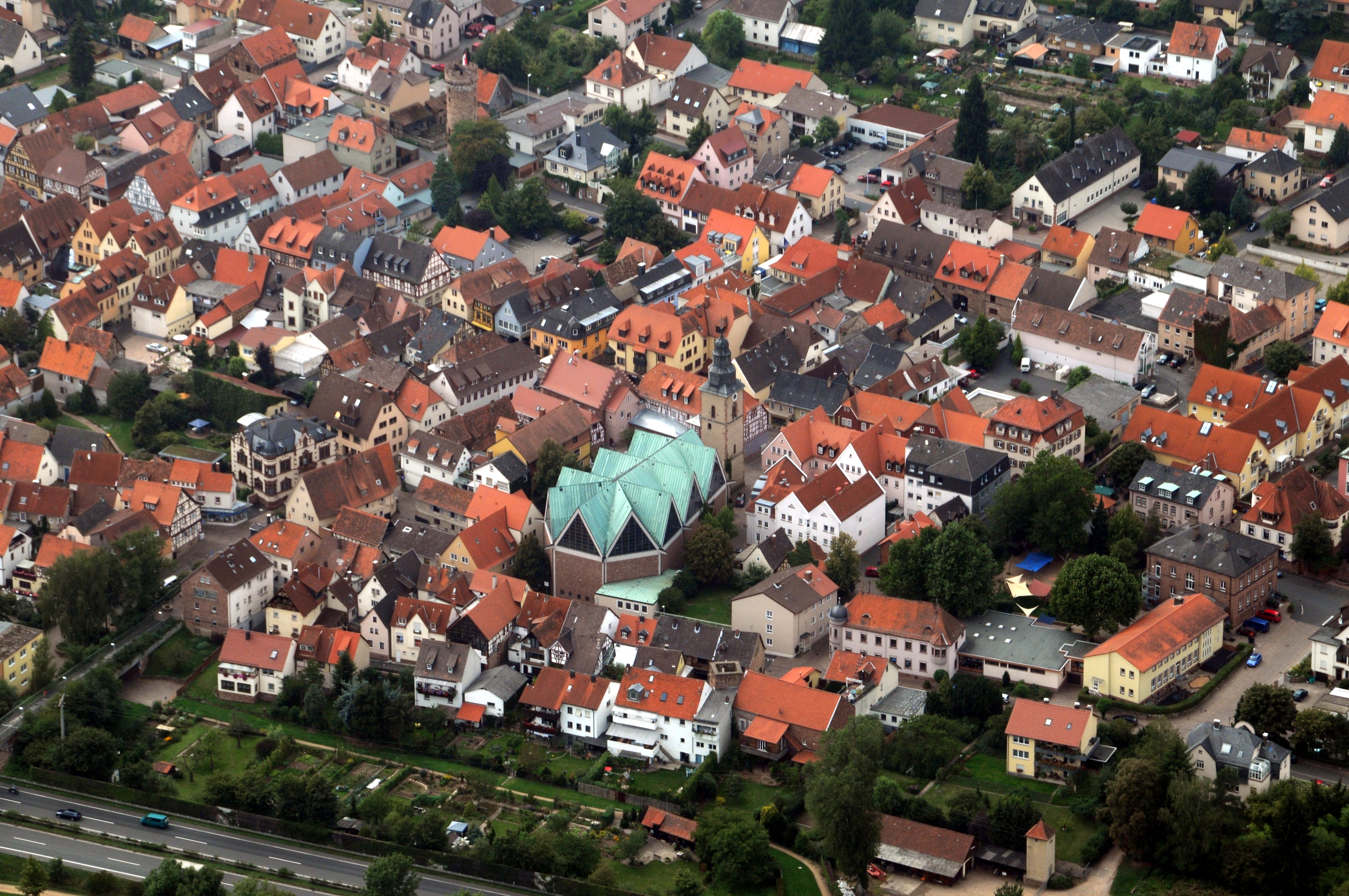
- Aerial picture of Obernburg

- Coat of arms

- Location of Obernburg a.Main within Miltenberg district
- Interactive map of Obernburg a.Main
- Location within Germany Location within Bavaria
- Coordinates: 49°50′24″N 09°8′29″E
- Country: Germany
- State: Bavaria
- Admin. region: Unterfranken
- District: Miltenberg
- Subdivisions: 2 Stadtteile

Government
  - Mayor (2020–26): Dietmar Fieger (CSU)

Area
  - Total: 24.82 km^{2} (9.58 sq mi)
- Elevation: 127 m (417 ft)

Population (2025-12-31)
  - Total: 8,583
  - Density: 345.8/km^{2} (895.6/sq mi)
- Time zone: UTC+01:00 (CET)
  - Summer (DST): UTC+02:00 (CEST)
- Postal codes: 63785
- Dialling codes: 06022
- Vehicle registration: MIL, OBB
- Website: www.obernburg.de

Obernburg am Main (German pronunciation: [ˈoːbɐnˌbʊʁk ʔam ˈmaɪn], lit. 'Obernburg on the Main'; officially Obernburg a.Main; South Franconian: Omborsch), commonly known as Obernburg, is a town in the Miltenberg district in the Regierungsbezirk of Lower Franconia (Unterfranken) in Bavaria, Germany. It has a population of around 8,500.

== Geography ==
Obernburg lies at the mouth of the river Mümling, where it empties into the Main, at the foot of the Odenwald (range).

== History ==
Between 83 and 85, the Romans constructed the Obernburg castrum, named Nemaninga, to guard the Limes Germanicus which followed the Main river here. It was originally built from wood but in the middle of the 2nd century AD replaced by a stone fort.

The castrum was the garrison of the Cohors IIII Aquitanorum equitata. The stone fort, with an area of 2.9 ha and a nearly rectangular ground plan of roughly 185/188 × 160 m was oriented to the river Main. Obernburg's old town still somewhat corresponds to the castrum's footprint, with some of the thoroughfares corresponding to Roman streets, such as today's Römerstrasse which follows the course of the fort's via principalis.

A beneficiarii station has been shown to have existed on the Limes road south of the castrum, from which numerous dedication stones have been secured.

In the Alamannic invasion of 259 and 260, the castrum fell, but was resettled later on. In the 4th and 5th centuries the Franks settled the area.

In 1204, Wolfger von Erla built a castle in defiance of the Count of Ortenburg in a feud.

On 25 March 1313, Obernburg was raised to town by Archbishop of Mainz Peter of Aspelt. The confirmation of town rights by Louis the Bavarian came on 27 July 1317 in a document issued in Aschaffenburg.

Until the Reichsdeputationshauptschluss in 1803, Obernburg belonged to Electoral Mainz. Thereafter it belonged to the newly formed Principality of Aschaffenburg, with which it passed in 1814 (by this time it had become a department of the Grand Duchy of Frankfurt) to the Kingdom of Bavaria. The town became the seat of an Amtsgericht.

In 1872, the railway line Aschaffenburg to Miltenberg was opened, with a stop at Obernburg. The first local bridge across the Main was built in 1892. In 1915-7 the Main was channeled and the weir with lock and a hydroelectric plant was constructed.

Until 1 July 1972, Obernburg was the seat of a like-named district. This was abolished in the course of municipal reform. On 1 May 1978, the neighbouring municipality of Eisenbach was amalgamated with Obernburg.

== Governance ==
=== Mayors ===
- since 2014: Dietmar Fieger (CSU)
- 2002–2014 Walter Berninger (CSU)
- 1975–2002 Wendelin Imhof (CSU)
- 1964–1975 Valentin Ballmann (FDP)
- 1945–1964 Willy Nees

=== Town council ===
The council is made up of 20 council members, with seats apportioned thus:

- CSU 7
- Freie Wähler 5
- Bündnis 90/Die Grünen 4
- Aktive Liste 3
- SPD 1

=== Coat of arms ===
The town's arms might be described thus: Argent on a mount vert a buck attired statant gules, in his mouth a bunch of grapes Or stalked of the second, in sinister a demi-tree of the second.

The town once bore different arms showing the Wheel of Mainz, but this charge was dropped when the town became part of Bavaria in 1814. The new arms were introduced on the Mayor's Medal in 1819. It has appeared in all official seals ever since.

== Economy ==
Obernburg's industrial area lies near the outlying centre of Eisenbach in the town's south. The largest company is the firm Reis Robotics.

On the other side of the Main lies another industrial area called the Industrie Center Obernburg (ICO). There, in line with tradition, various kinds of chemical fibres are produced. Moreover, the industrial park is home to many other, smaller businesses in various fields. Although the industrial park bears the name "Obernburg", and this is also the postal address, it actually lies exclusively within the communities of Erlenbach am Main and Elsenfeld.

== Arts and culture ==
=== Historic buildings ===
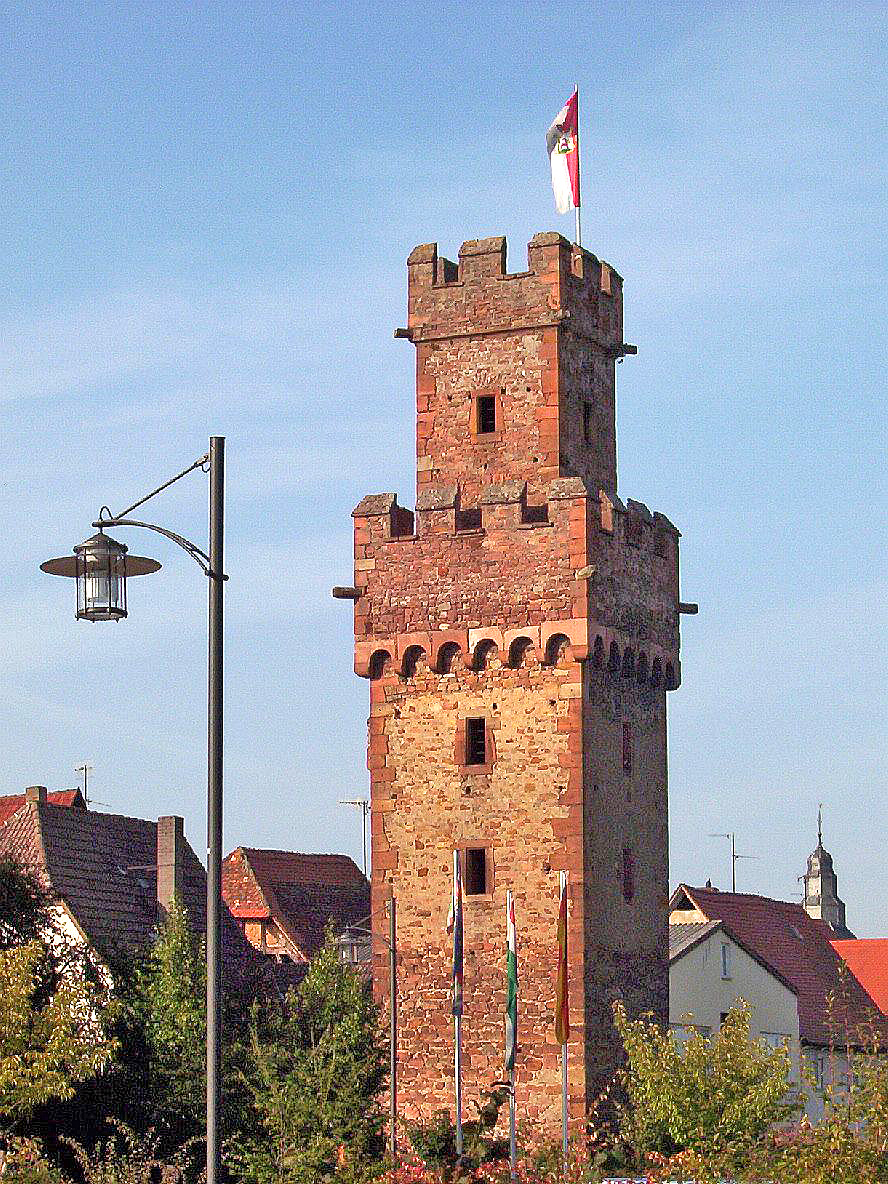
Almosenturm in Obernburg

Obernburg retains a significant part of its town fortifications, particularly the Upper Gate (Oberes Tor), the Alms Tower (Almosenturm) and the Round Tower (Runder Turm). Other historic buildings include the town hall, the Annakapelle (chapel) and the Baroque church in Eisenbach.

=== Theatre ===
- Kleinkunstbühne Kochsmühle (cabaret)

=== Museums ===
- The Römermuseum ("Roman Museum") exhibits the traces of Roman settlement in Obernburg and the surrounding area.
- The Eisenbacher Heimatmuseum (local history) is housed in the outlying centre's former new town hall.

=== Tourism/hiking paths ===
Since 1990, Obernburg has been located on the Fränkischer Rotwein Wanderweg ("Franconian Red Wine Hiking Trail"). European walking route E8 runs through Obernburg, linking County Kerry in Ireland to Istanbul in Turkey.

=== Regular events ===
- In July, the Mirabellenfest ("Mirabelle Plum Festival") is celebrated in Eisenbach
- Since 1989 the Obernburger Mühlstein ("Obernburg Millstone"), a prize for newcomers in cabaret, has been regularly awarded in Obernburg.

== Sports ==
The sport club TUSPO Obernburg is above all known for its team handball department in the Men's Second Handball Bundesliga.

== Infrastructure ==
=== Public institutions ===
The Obernburg District Court (Amtsgericht Obernburg) is the court with jurisdiction over the Miltenberg district.

In Obernburg there are a branch office of the Miltenberg district office (Landratsamt), the Obernburg Financial Office responsible for the district and a branch office of the Aschaffenburg Employment Office.

== Education ==
Schools of general education (Allgemeinbildende Schulen) in Obernburg are the Johannes-Obernburger-Volksschule (primary school and Hauptschule), the Eisenbach primary school and the Main-Limes-Realschule. Vocational training schools are the Staatliche Berufsschule Miltenberg-Obernburg, the Berufsfachschule für Kaufmännische Assistenten (for sales assistants) and the Staatliche Fachoberschule und Berufsoberschule Obernburg. Furthermore, there are a municipal music school and the Dr.-Albert-Liebmann-Schule.

== Notable people ==
- Adam Lux (1765–1793), revolutionary at the time of the French Revolution
- Urban Priol (born 1961), cabaret performer
- Hildegard Heichele (born 1947), soprano
- Dominik Klein (born 1983), professional handballer
- Gitti und Erika (born 1958, born 1956), singers

== Twin towns – sister citites ==
Obernburg is twinned with:

- Aszód, Hungary
