= PickNik Robotics =

American robotics software company

PickNik Robotics is an American robotics software company based in Boulder, Colorado, that develops motion planning and robotic manipulation software. The company is a major contributor to the open-source MoveIt motion planning framework and develops a commercial software platform, MoveIt Pro.

== History ==
PickNik Robotics was founded in 2015 by Dave Coleman, who had worked on MoveIt as an intern at Willow Garage. After Willow Garage closed in 2014, Coleman formed PickNik the following year to continue maintaining MoveIt.

The company received funding through NASA's Small Business Innovation Research (SBIR) program, accumulating over $9 million in federal awards from NASA, the United States Space Force, and the Department of Defense. In 2021, PickNik was ranked No. 505 on the Inc. 5000 list.

== Relationship with MoveIt ==
MoveIt is an open-source motion planning framework for the Robot Operating System (ROS) used in robotic manipulation. PickNik is one of the project's primary maintainers. The company is listed as a member of the Open Source Robotics Alliance (OSRA), which oversees governance of ROS and related projects.

== Commercial software ==
PickNik's commercial product, originally called MoveIt Studio, was renamed MoveIt Pro in 2024. According to a NASA Spinoff profile, the software has been used by BMW for assembly lines, Amazon Web Services for robotic demonstrations, and Lightspeed for construction robotics.

== Space robotics ==
In 2022, PickNik won a SpaceWERX contract from the United States Space Force to develop robotic control software for on-orbit capture, collaborating with the University of Texas at Austin.

The Japan Aerospace Exploration Agency (JAXA) tested MoveIt Pro as the planning and control software for its four-armed Payload Organization and Transportation Robotic System (PORTRS), designed for the International Space Station.

In 2026, Motiv Space Systems contracted PickNik to provide motion planning software for NASA's Fly Foundational Robotics (FFR) mission, which aims to demonstrate robotic manipulation in low Earth orbit using Space ROS.

== See also ==
- List of robotics companies
- Robot Operating System
