= NDC Netzler & Dahlgren Co AB =

Swedish technology company

Netzler & Dahlgren Co AB, or NDC for short, was a Swedish company founded in 1962 by Göran Netzler and Anders Dahlgren. The initial business idea was to build customized electronics equipment. Over the years, NDC evolved into a technology platform provider (navigation, hardware, software) for AGV (automated guided vehicle) builders. Danaher acquired NDC in 2001.

== History ==
=== The first years ===
NDC began producing specially built electronics equipment on a small scale for a variety of industries, for example, manufacturing and marine. The number of owners grew in the 1960s to include Ingvar Bergström, Arne Nilsson and Jan Jutander.

At the beginning of the 1970s, NDC had some 30 employees and started to attract big companies such as Getinge, Tetra Pak and Volvo. The first AGV project was for the Volvo Kalmar Assembly plant in 1972. NDC was involved in producing the AGV prototypes but was considered too small to take on the total project. They were, however, commissioned to deliver all the drives. At that time, the Volvo plant was a revolution in the automotive industry, introducing a totally new way of working.

=== New business model ===
In 1976, Tetra Pak installed twenty AGVs in their plant in Lund, Sweden. NDC provided the electronics, Tellus the mechanics and ErgoData the control system. The project was a success, and Tetra Pak began to introduce AGVs in their plants worldwide. NDC was involved in many AGV projects for Tetra Pak during the 1970s and 1980s, and saw its chance to expand the business into something more.

In the early 1980s, NDC made the strategically important decision to focus on creating a generic controls platform for AGV builders. Driven by the development of computer technology, it was now possible for NDC to offer the flexibility that AGV builders needed to create customized driverless vehicles. The new NDC business model was born: “Generic technology to be applied by others.”

The first partner was the French company Lamson Saunier Duval, and the number of partners quickly grew into two digits. NDC spent a lot of time educating partners on all the possibilities of generic technology.

The new business model paved the way for international expansion with NDC subsidiaries in Italy, the Czech Republic and the United States. The American NDC subsidiary, NDC Automation Inc., had its own subsidiary in Australia. NDC Automation Inc. went public on March 28, 1990, and subsequently changed its name to Transbotics in 2001.

=== The laser revolution ===
Laser technology took off in many industrial applications in the 1980s, and NDC started to explore the potential. In 1991, NDC introduced laser technology as AGV navigation for a Tetra Pak factory in Singapore. Tetra Pak appreciated the ease-of-change to new working patterns with laser navigation and began a worldwide plant upgrade to laser navigation. NDC named their navigation technology Lazerway.

In the 1990s, AGVs increased in complexity. By focusing on being a technology platform provider (navigation, hardware, software), NDC could stay strong in an AGV industry that had split into new categories such as mobile robots.

=== NDC today ===
After the Danaher acquisition in 2001, NDC was named Danaher Motion and later on transformed into the Kollmorgen brand. The NDC brand name was kept but is now the name of the technology platform: NDC Solutions.

As of July 2016, Kollmorgen is part of Fortive Corporation.
