= Zhiwei Robotics Corp. =

- Industry: Robotics; Open-source hardware
- Founded: 2008 in Beijing, China
- Founder: Ricky Ye
- Headquarters: Shanghai, China
- Area served: Worldwide
- Products: Arduino, Raspberry Pi, development boards, sensors, modules, robotics, 3D printers, STEM education kits,LattePanda
- Website: Official website

Zhiwei Robotics Corp. is a Chinese robotics manufacturer and open source hardware provider. The company was founded in 2008 by Ricky Ye and is currently headquartered in Shanghai, China.

== History ==
Zhiwei Robotics Corp. was established in 2008 and their headquarters was moved to Zhangjiang Hi-Tech Park, Shanghai in 2010. The company is also known as DFRobot which is the abbreviation of Drive the Future and Dream Factory. Zhiwei Robotics is among the early pioneers of the Maker Movement in China and Arduino, an open-source manufacturer of single-board microcontrollers and microcontroller kits for building digital devices. The company opened their manufacturing plant in Chengdu in 2011. Zhiwei Robotics Corp. started their first hackerspace, Mushroom Cloud, in Shanghai, in 2012. In March 2016, the Ministry of Science and Technology of the People's Republic of China officially opened Mushroom Cloud to the national public, and included it into the National Science and Technology Business Incubator Management System of China.

In November 2016, Zhiwei Robotics Corp. received the High-tech Enterprise Certificate award from the Shanghai Municipal Science and Technology Commission, the Shanghai Municipal Bureau of Finance, the Shanghai Municipal State Taxation Bureau, and the Shanghai Local Taxation Bureau jointly. In December 2016, Zhiwei Robotics Corp. was listed at the national share transfer system.

== Technology and products ==
Zhiwei Robotics Corp. manufactures and provides electronic components and widgets such as Arduino controllers, Raspberry Pi, development boards, sensors and modules, robotics, and 3D printers.

- Boson - The Boson kit is a set of modular electronic building blocks composed of 45 different modules. Boson is marketed as a code-free STEM kit, which is claimed to be compatible with the BBC Micro Bit.
- Antbo - Antbo is an educational bionic robot kit for children. It can be controlled by drawing lines, voice, or a remote. Users can add functionality to Antbo with modules or by modifying its programing. Antbo can upload various metrics to the cloud so users can track and share their stats. Through voice-control and lighting it aims to develop an emotional connection with users.
- Vortex - Vortex is an Arduino-based robot. The robot is programmed to initiate commands by tapping the screen in the Vortex app. Vortex has 32 eyes expressions and unlimited light effects.
- LattePanda - LattePanda is a development board with built-in Arduino that runs a desktop version of Windows 10, Linux and Android.
- Overlord ProPlus - Overlord ProPlus is a 3D printer which was released in 2015.
