= Dobot =

Global collaborative robots manufacturer

Shenzhen Dobot Corp Ltd
- Native name: 深圳市越疆科技股份有限公司
- Type: Public
- Traded as: SEHK: 2432
- Industry: Robotics
- Founded: June 2015; 11 years ago
- Founders: Liu Peichao; Lang Xulin
- Headquarters: Shenzhen, Guangdong, China
- Key people: Liu Peichao (Chairman & CEO)
- Revenue: ▲CN¥286.75 million (2023)
- Net income: ▼CN¥−103.28 million (2023)
- Total assets: ▼CN¥734.89 million (2023)
- Total equity: ▼CN¥341.06 million (2023)
- Number of employees: 757
- Website: www.dobot-robots.com

Shenzhen Dobot Corp Ltd, doing business as Dobot, is a provider of collaborative robots and the creator of desktop-grade robotic arms. The company was founded in 2015 and is based in Shenzhen, China.

== History ==
Dobot company was founded in June 2015. In October of that year, the company launched a Kickstarter campaign for a desktop robotic arm called Dobot. The campaign was successful, raising over $600,000 more than the initial goal of $36,000. The success of the Kickstarter campaign led to an additional $3 million of third-round funding for the startup in April 2016, making it one of the most valuable robotics startups in China.

By March 2017, the company had expanded to have 96 employees. That year, a calligraphy performance by the Dobot Magician was featured in the CCTV New Year's Gala broadcast, drawing further publicity.

On 23 December 2024, Dobot held its initial public offering (IPO) becoming a listed company on the Hong Kong Stock Exchange. The offering raised HK$681 million.

== Robotic Products ==
In 2023, Dobot launched the industrial-grade educational robot Magician E6 and CRA series.

Dobot Scara M1, which also premiered in 2016, features two toolheads, with the options of a gripper hand, a suction cup, a 3D printer, a 4th axis attachment, or a laser engraver. The M1 can be programmed by a manual learning mode or through coding and is intended primarily for industrial use by small businesses.

In 2016, Dobot released the Dobot Magician, which allows precision writing and laser engraving.
