= Leju Robot =

Chinese robotics company

Leju (Shenzhen) Robotics Co., Ltd.
- Industry: Robotics
- Founded: 2016; 10 years ago in China
- Headquarters: Shenzhen, China
- Products: Robots
- Website: www.lejurobot.com/en

Leju Robot (Chinese: 乐聚机器人), officially known as Leju (Shenzhen) Robotics Co., Ltd. (乐聚(深圳)机器人技术有限公司), established in 2016, is a humanoid robotics company based in Shenzhen, China, with branches in Harbin and Hangzhou.

The company has developed torque servos and self-stabilizing biped gait algorithms, mastering technologies such as robot structural design, core component manufacturing, and AI algorithm development. The company's legal representative is Leng Xiaokun.

== History ==
Leju (Shenzhen) Robotics Co., Ltd. was officially founded in 2016 and received RMB 10 million in angel investment from Songhe Capital. In August of the same year, the company launched its first-generation humanoid robot, AELOS, which entered mass production. In 2017, Leju secured tens of millions of RMB in pre-A funding from Shenzhen Capital Group and an additional RMB 50 million in strategic investment from Tencent. By 2018, the company released its flagship product from the MINI series, PANDO. In 2025, Leju delivered its 100th full-size humanoid robot.

== Products ==
- KUAVO Series: General-purpose humanoid robots.
- AELOS Series: Educational robots designed for teaching and research.
- PANDO Series: Miniature humanoid robots suitable for various applications.
- ROBAN: Medium bipedal
- Fluvo Series: Hospital logistics robots
- CUBE: Smart Building Block Kit
- Clamber Man: Heavy-Duty Transport Robot
