= HIWIN =

Taiwanese manufacturing company

- Native name: 上銀科技股份有限公司
- Type: Public company
- Traded as: TWSE: 2049
- Founded: 11 October 1989; 36 years ago
- Founder: Yung-Tsai Chuo
- Headquarters: No. 7, JingKe Road, Nantun District, Taichung City, 408, Taichung, Taiwan
- Area served: Worldwide
- Products: linear motion guides, ball spline, ball screws
- Revenue: US$470.16million (2018)
- Number of employees: 5,016 (2018)
- Website: www.hiwin.tw

HIWIN (Chinese: 上銀科技; pinyin: Shàngyín Kējì) is a major Taiwanese company which manufactures machinery components. It was founded in 1989 and is based in Taichung, Taiwan.

HIWIN is a combination of HIgh-tech WINner.

Overseas Subsidiaries include: Germany, Japan, United States, Italy, Switzerland, Czech Republic, France, Singapore, South Korea, China Suzhou

R&D Centers are located in: Tokyo (Japan), Offenburg (Germany)

The company is known for linear motion guides, ball splines, and ball screws., The company also manufacturers and sells additional mechanical motion control components as well as multi-axis custom developed systems, torque motor rotary tables and robots and related accessories.

The company Chairman is Wen Hen Chuo.

As of March 2023, there were 6,438 employees.
