= Mantis Robotics =

American industrial robotics company

- Type: Private
- Industry: Robotics
- Founded: 2020
- Founder: Gerry Vannuffelen
- Headquarters: Pleasanton, California, United States
- Key people: Gerry Vannuffelen (CEO)
- Products: MR-1, MR-X robot arms
- Number of employees: 45 (2026)
- Website: www.mantis-robotics.com

Mantis Robotics is an American manufacturer of physically intelligent, human-centered robotics. Founded in 2020, the company produces industrial robot arms, including the MR-1 and MR-X, that use onboard sensing technology it markets as Physical AI to operate near human workers without safety fencing. In February 2026, the MR-1 received safety certification to ISO 10218 and ISO 13849, issued by SGS Fimko Oy.

== History ==
Mantis Robotics was founded in 2020 by Gerry Vannuffelen, who is Chief Executive Officer. The company established its headquarters in Pleasanton, California, with research and development offices in Leuven, Belgium, and Taipei, Taiwan.

In April 2022, Mantis Robotics secured funding as part of the inaugural cohort of the Amazon Industrial Innovation Fund. Although the transaction details and investment amount were undisclosed, Mantis was notable for being the youngest company selected in the fund's initial portfolio block. In December 2024, Mantis Robotics announced that it had raised an additional $5 million in funding led by Emerald Technology Ventures, with participation from the Amazon Industrial Innovation Fund.

The company later announced further investment from the Taiwanese conglomerate ABICO Group, linked to a plan to distribute its robot arms in Taiwan and Japan. In 2025, Deutsche Messe named Mantis Robotics one of three nominees for the Robotics Award at Hannover Messe, citing its work on a high-speed industrial robot with onboard three-dimensional spatial perception.

In February 2026, the company announced that its MR-1 arm had been certified to the ISO 10218 and ISO 13849 safety standards by SGS Fimko Oy, a subsidiary of SGS S.A. Mantis described the arm as the first fenceless high-speed industrial robot to receive such certification.

On 23 June 2026, Mantis Robotics introduced the MR-X, a biomimetic dual-arm robot, at the Automate trade show in Chicago. According to the company, the MR-X applies the fenceless safety architecture of the MR-1 to a two-armed design intended for assembly, material transfer and package sorting, and can be installed in fixed positions or mounted on mobile platforms.

Mantis' robot arms are designed for manufacturing and e-commerce warehouse fulfillment environments, where the company states they can operate directly alongside human workers without the safety cages or fencing typically required for industrial robot arms.

== Technology ==
The company markets its safety system as SafetyCore, which it describes as continuously processing the robot's surroundings and altering its path when a person enters it, rather than relying on external sensors or fixed exclusion zones. Mantis states that the MR-1 contains 47 embedded safety functions rated to Performance Level d, and refers to its proximity-detection sensing as STAR.

== Products ==
Robot arms
Model	Type	Payload	Maximum speed	Certification
MR-1	Single-arm	5 kg	10 m/s	ISO 10218 and ISO 13849, February 2026
MR-X	Dual-arm	32 kg	10.6 m/s	Company states it is designed to meet ISO 10218-1 and ISO 13849-1
