= X Square Robot =

Chinese robotics and artificial intelligence company

- Native name: 自变量机器人
- Type: Private
- Industry: Robotics, artificial intelligence
- Founded: December 2023; 2 years ago
- Founder: Wang Qian
- Headquarters: Shenzhen, China
- Key people: Wang Qian (founder and CEO)
- Products: WALL series, QUANTA X1 Pro, QUANTA X2, ArtiXon, QUANXTA Zero
- Website: x2robot.com/en

X Square Robot (Chinese: 自变量机器人; pinyin: Zìbiànliàng Jīqìrén) is a robotics and artificial intelligence company headquartered in Shenzhen, China. Founded in December 2023 by Wang Qian, the company develops embodied AI foundation models and robot hardware. Its products include the WALL series of embodied AI models, the QUANTA series of robots, the ArtiXon dexterous hand, and the QUANXTA Zero data-collection platform.

== History ==
X Square Robot was founded in December 2023 in Shenzhen. In September 2025, the company raised nearly 1 billion yuan (about US$140 million) in a Series A+ round led by Alibaba Cloud, the first investment by Alibaba's cloud unit in embodied intelligence. Other participants included HongShan, Meituan and Legend Capital. Alongside the round, the company released WALL-OSS, an open-source embodied foundation model, and the QUANTA X2 wheeled humanoid robot.

In January 2026, X Square Robot completed a 1 billion yuan (about US$140 million) A++ round led by ByteDance, HongShan and Shenzhen Capital Group, alongside other funds.

Between late March and early April 2026, the company closed a Series B round of nearly 2 billion yuan (about US$276 million), led by Xiaomi's strategic investment arm and HongShan.

In March 2026, X Square Robot co-organised the Embodied AI Developers Conference (EAIDC 2026) and an accompanying hackathon in Nanshan District, Shenzhen. More than 100 teams took part, with 20 reaching the final.

In June 2026, X Square Robot announced the completion of four consecutive financing rounds, including a Series C round, which valued the company at more than US$2.8 billion (approximately 20 billion yuan). IDG Capital participated in the Series C financing. Earlier funding rounds had included investments led by Meituan, Alibaba Group, ByteDance and Xiaomi.

In August 2026, X Square Robot participated in the World Robot Conference in Beijing, where it demonstrated applications of its WALL-B foundation model in logistics, household tasks and robotic manipulation.

== Technology and products ==
=== WALL models ===
The WALL series is a family of embodied artificial intelligence foundation models developed by X Square Robot. In September 2025, the company released WALL-OSS, an open-source vision-language-action model. The release included model parameters, training and inference code, and related development tools.

In April 2026, X Square Robot introduced WALL-B, a foundation model based on its World Unified Model architecture. The model integrates visual perception, language processing, action generation and physical-world prediction within a single model architecture. WALL-B was presented at an event in Beijing in April 2026.

The company has also released the open-source models WALL-OSS-0.5 and WALL-WM, which are intended for robot manipulation and world-modeling applications, respectively.

=== Robotics Hardware ===
The company's hardware includes the QUANTA X1 Pro, a wheeled bimanual robot used as a research platform, and the QUANTA X2, a wheeled humanoid robot for service, household and industrial use. The QUANTA X2 has a wheeled chassis, arms with seven degrees of freedom and 20-degree-of-freedom dexterous hands, with up to 62 degrees of freedom in total. X Square Robot has also developed five-finger dexterous hands and six-axis robotic arms. The six-axis arms have been demonstrated in parcel-sorting applications.

=== Data collection ===
In 2026, X Square Robot introduced the QUANXTA Zero Series, a hardware and software platform for embodiment-free embodied data production. The family comprises the Zero G1, which uses a headband and dual grippers to capture movement, visual, tactile and audio data; the Zero G0, which supports whole-body mobile collection using a VR headset, dual grippers and a backpack; and the compact Zero E0, equipped with six cameras.

In June 2026, the company open-sourced XRZero-G0 together with the G0-Dataset, a 2,000-hour multimodal dataset for robotics research.

== Deployments ==
X Square Robot has tested its robotic systems in household, logistics, manufacturing, hospitality and public-service environments. In March 2026, X Square Robot partnered with the Chinese household-services platform 58.com to launch a cleaning service in Shenzhen in which a wheeled robot works alongside a human cleaner. The service was later extended to Beijing.

The company also runs the "X Family Member Program", under which robots are placed with households for periods of up to one month. The company is also working with one of China’s leading logistics companies to introduce embodied AI robots into parcel feeding and sorting operations.

In August 2026, X Square Robot conducted two livestreamed parcel-sorting demonstrations using its WALL-B foundation model and six-axis robotic arms. The second demonstration, held during the World Robot Conference, lasted just over five hours and processed 10,000 parcels.
