= Prioria (company) =

American robotics company

Prioria Inc.
- Company type: Private
- Founded: Florida, U.S. (2003, as Prioria Robotics, Inc.)
- Website: Prioria.com

Prioria, formally known as Prioria Robotics Inc., was an American corporation that originally focused on designing embedded sensor processing products and services. Established in Gainesville, Florida in 2003, Prioria transitioned from embedded systems to the design and development of unmanned aircraft. The company would go on to develop multiple Unmanned aircraft platforms as well as offering commercial services.

The first unmanned aircraft developed, sold, and supported the Maveric Unmanned Aerial Vehicle (also called an autonomous Micro Air Vehicle), while also maintaining a services division focused on defense focused research and development of embedded sensor processing systems. After Maveric, the Company developed Leviathan, a larger fixed wing UAS and the Hex Rotor. In 2014 the company transitioned to offering commercial services.

Prioria was the first company to beat Aerovironment in a Program of Record for small UAS, though Aerovironment would win it back in the next cycle.
