= Reis Robotics =

German industrial robot manufacturer

Reis Robotics Inc.
- Type: Private (subsidiary of Reis Robotics GmbH & Co. KG)
- Industry: Automation
- Founded: 1957
- Headquarters: Obernburg, Bavaria, Germany
- Products: Industrial robots and software solutions
- Divisions: Reis Robotics USA
- Website: www.reisrobotics.com

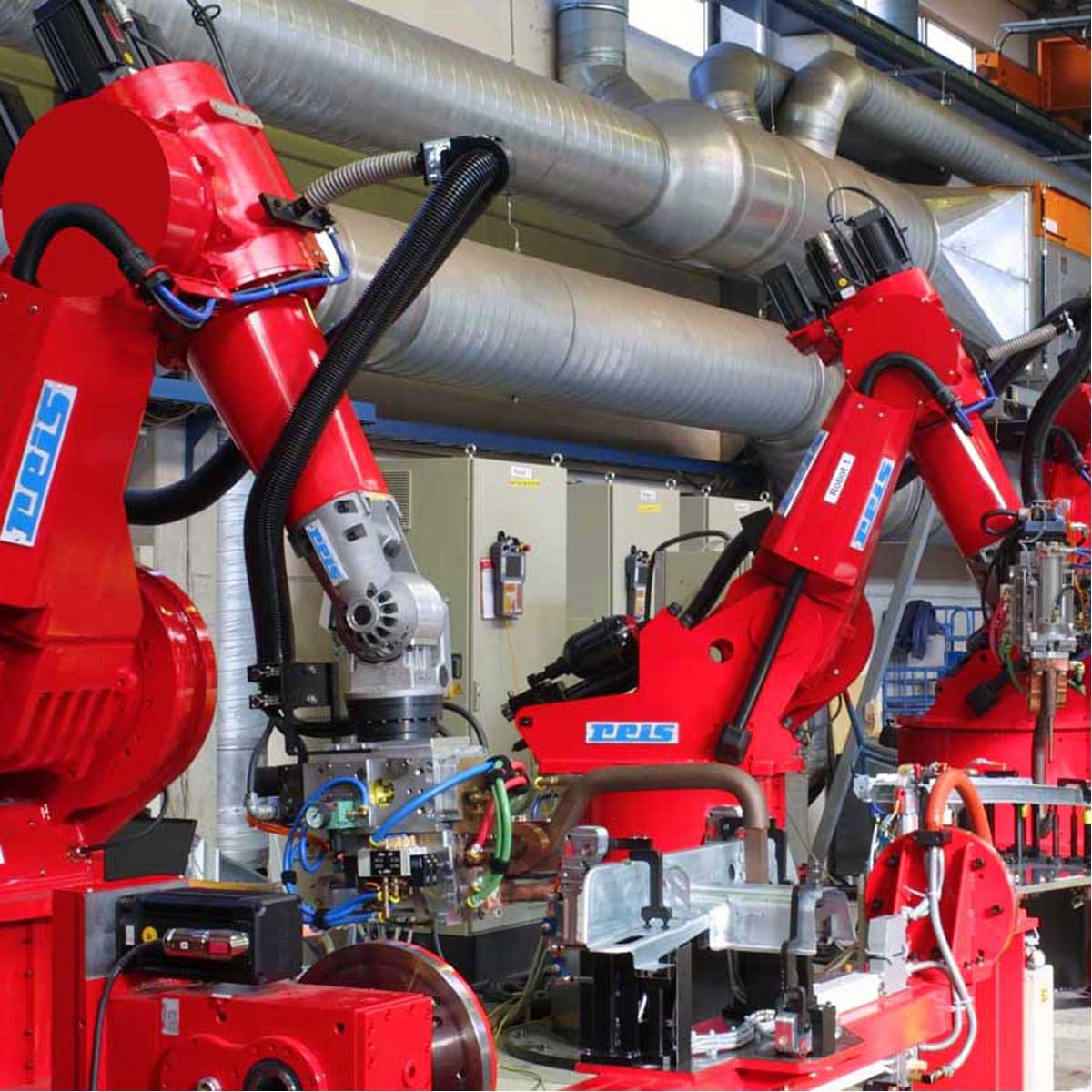
Reis robots in a welding cell

Reis Robotics is a German industrial robot manufacturer and systems integrator. In addition to robots and peripheral modules, Reis Robotics produces spotting and trimming presses and trimming tools.

Reis Robotics comprises three German subsidiaries and eight international subsidiaries and several representative agencies. Reis Robotics USA has two locations, the headquarters in Elgin, IL and the west coast technical center in Valencia, CA.

== Overview ==
Reis Robotics was founded in 1957 in Obernburg, Bavaria, Germany by Walter Reis who received the Rudolf Diesel Medal in 2006 and the German Mechanical Engineering Prize in 2011. In 2010, 18 companies in the Reis Group were combined as the Reis Group Holding GmbH & Co KG. The largest company within the Reis Group was Reis GmbH & Co KG Maschinenfabrik (Reis Robotics) in Obernburg, Bavaria. The machine factory had around 700 employees (35% of them engineers) who work in the field of development and production of automation systems and robots. A major field of activity of Reis Robotics was the development and implementation of complex automation systems for all areas of industrial production. The group also included other high-tech development companies in Germany which focused on specific areas of robot application and supplied their products to both Reis Robotics and companies out of the Reis group. Since 2012, Reis Robotics has also been developing mold casting machines and automation equipment for the post-processing of cast parts for foundry technology.

In 2013, KUKA, an industrial robot-manufacturing company acquired 51% shares of Reis Robotics. In 2016, KUKA took over the remaining shares and became the sole owner.
