= Estun Automation =

Chinese automation company

Estun Automation Co., Ltd.
- Native name: 南京埃斯顿自动化股份有限公司
- Type: Public
- Traded as: SZSE: 002747; SEHK: 2715
- Industry: Robotics
- Founded: March 1993; 33 years ago
- Founder: Wu Bo
- Headquarters: Nanjing, Jiangsu, China
- Key people: Wu Bo (Chairman); Wu Kan (President)
- Revenue: ▼CN¥4 billion (2024)
- Net income: ▼CN¥−817 million (2024)
- Total assets: ▲CN¥10.14 billion (2024)
- Total equity: ▼CN¥1.89 billion (2024)
- Number of employees: 3223
- Website: www.estun.com

Estun Automation (Chinese: 埃斯顿自动; pinyin: Āisīdùn zìdòng) is a publicly listed Chinese company that engages in the provision of industrial robot solutions.

According to Frost & Sullivan, Estun has ranked first in terms of shipments among domestic enterprises in the Chinese industrial robot solutions market for many years.

== Background ==
In 1993, Estun was founded in Nanjing, Jiangsu by Wu Bo, a former lecturer at Nanjing Forestry University who later worked at the Jiangsu Machinery & Equipment Import & Export Corporation.

Estun originally focused on computer numerical control systems for machine tools and then moved to industrial robots. It entered the industrial robot space in 2012.

In 2015, Estun held its initial public offering becoming a listed company on the Shenzhen Stock Exchange.

In 2016, Estun acquired a 20 percent stake in Euclid, an Italian 3D vision technology company.

In 2017, Estun acquired UK motion controller firm Trio for £15 million as well as German company M.A.i for €8.87 million. It also acquired a minority interest in Barrett Technology for $9 million.

In 2020, Estun completed the acquisition of a 32.5% stake in German welding robotic company CLOOS.

In June 2025, Estun applied for a secondary listing on the Hong Kong Stock Exchange although its initial application lapsed. It made a second attempt in January 2026. In March 2026, Estun was listed on the Hong Kong Stock Exchange.
