= Flexiv =

Robotics company

Flexiv Ltd.
- Type: Private
- Industry: Automation
- Founded: June 2016
- Founder: Shiquan Wang (CEO)
- Headquarters: Shanghai
- Area served: Worldwide
- Products: Adaptive robots
- Website: www.flexiv.com

Flexiv Ltd. is a robotics company founded by Shiquan Wang in 2016 that manufactures adaptive robots. The company's primary products include Rizon and Moonlight robots. It also manufactures end effectors and grippers. The firm originated out of Stanford University, and it once used Nvidia's Isaac Replicator.

Headquartered in Shanghai, Flexiv has established operations in the U.S. and Singapore. The company was financed by Plug & Play Ventures, Gaorong Capital, and YF Capital. In the second half of 2020, it began mass-producing robots. In the same year, it was included in an analysis report on cobots published by Frost & Sullivan. In May 2024, the firm collaborated with Siemens. In September, it attended the TAiROS Exhibition in Taipei.

== History ==
Flexiv was established in 2016. In 2019, it introduced the Rizon robot. In the same year, it exhibited at the Hannover Messe. In December 2020, the company completed a Series B funding round of more than $100 million.

In June 2022, Flexiv became a unicorn company. In February 2023, it participated in the IME West Show in California. In September 2024, it developed an automated fish fillet shaping solution.
