= Robotics (disambiguation) =

Robotics is the study, design and construction of robots. Related articles include:

- Cognitive robotics, a subfield of robotics concerned with endowing a robot with intelligent behavior.
- Robotic process automation, a form of business process automation that is based on bots or AI agents.
- Microrobotics, a field miniature robots with characteristic dimensions less than 1 mm.
- Nanorobotics, an emerging technology field creating machines or robots.
- Cloud robotics, a field of robotics attempting to invoke cloud technologies.
- Biorobotics, an interdisplinary science that combines the fields of biomedical engineering, cybernetics and robotics to develop new technologies.
- Swarm robotics, the study on how to design independent systems of robots without centralized control.
