= Twice (online retailer) =

Online marketplace

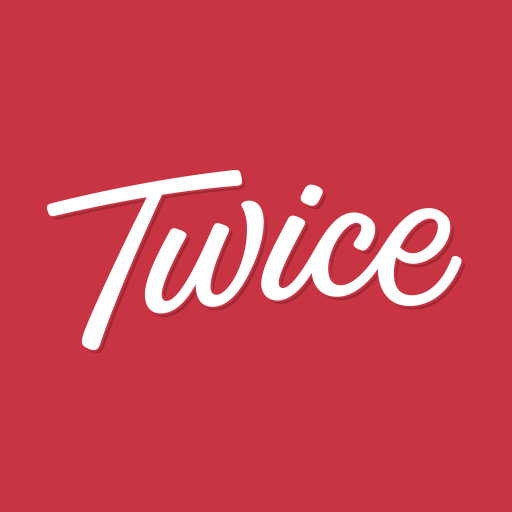
- Type: Subsidiary of eBay
- Industry: E-commerce, Apparel, Retail
- Founded: 2012
- Founders: Noah Ready-Campbell, Calvin Young
- Headquarters: San Francisco, California, United States
- Number of employees: 250+

Twice was an online marketplace for buying and selling secondhand apparel based in San Francisco, CA. The e-commerce platform was created to make selling used goods easier and shopping used like buying new. Twice manages the selling process for the customer, such as pricing, shipping and merchandising. Twice vets each item to ensure it meets “like new” standards. The company currently buys and sells men's and women's clothing as well as women’s shoes and handbags from popular retailers and brands.

Twice was acquired by eBay in July 2015. Since launching, the company has grown to more than one million users.

== History ==
Twice launched in 2012 starting with women's clothing. In October 2014, the company expanded into women's shoes and handbags. Twice launched into menswear in January 2015. As of late 2015 Twice has been shut down.

== Founders ==
Noah Ready-Campbell and Calvin Young are the founders of Twice. Noah is the CEO of Twice and Calvin is the CTO. Noah and Calvin started their careers at Google and joined Y Combinator. Noah graduated from the University of Pennsylvania’s Wharton School with a dual degree in engineering from the Jerome Fisher Program in Management and Technology. Calvin received a dual degree from the University of North Carolina, Chapel Hill.

== Funding/strategic partners ==
Twice is backed by Andreessen Horowitz, SV Angel and IA Ventures. To date, Twice has received $23.1 Million in funding.

== Buying and selling ==
Users can sell clothing, shoes and handbags in two ways: request a prepaid selling kit or print out a shipping label. Twice processes the items and sends an all-or-nothing offer to the user within days, which users accept or reject. If accepted, Twice offers multiple options for immediate payout including PayPal and Venmo. If rejected, Twice charges $4.95 for return shipping. Items that are not returned are donated or recycled.

Each item Twice receives is assessed based on company requirements: items must be less than five years old, an accepted brand, and in like-new condition. Once approved, items are priced, steamed, merchandised and listed for purchase at roughly 70-90% less than the original retail value.

== Awards and recognition ==
- Entrepreneur's 100 Brilliant Companies
- 2015 Forbes 30 Under 30: Noah Ready-Campbell & Calvin Young of Twice
- 2015 Inc. Magazine’s 30 Under 30 list: Noah Ready-Campbell & Calvin Young of Twice
