= Mech-Mind Robotics =

Chinese robotics company

Mech-Mind Robotics Technologies Ltd.
- Type: Private
- Industry: Industrial automation
- Founded: 2016; 10 years ago
- Headquarters: Beijing and Shanghai, China
- Area served: 50+ countries and regions (as of April 2025)
- Key people: Shao Tianlan (founder ＆ CEO)
- Website: www.mech-mind.com

Mech-Mind Robotics (short for Mech-Mind Robotics Technologies Ltd.), simply known as Mech-Mind, is a Chinese industrial robotics and AI company founded by Shao Tianlan in 2016. The main products of the company are industrial 3D cameras and AI-powered software for smart robots, including Mech-Eye series, Mech-Vision, Mech-DLK, and Mech-Viz.

Mech-Mind focuses on the production of hardware and software products in the field of 3D vision. The company specializes in AI robotics. Its products are mainly used in the industries of logistics, home appliance, and steel. In addition, the company also offers other services, such as staff training, and deployment planning.

The products of Mech-Mind are primarily designed to put intelligence into industrial robots. After its inception, the company was funded by IDG Capital, Qiming Venture Partners, and Intel Capital. It has collaborated with Yaskawa Electric. In 2020, Mech-Mind appeared in the German edition of the December issue of MIT Technology Review.

== History ==
Established by Shao Tianlan in 2016 in Beijing, Mech-Mind made its first public debut at the 2017 Hannover Messe. In 2019, the company was backed by Intel Capital. In 2020, it attended the CeMAT Asia Exhibition.

In September 2021, Mech-Mind completed a Series C round of financing of nearly 1 billion yuan. By January 2024, the company had established operations in Germany, Japan, and the United States.
