= Active Robots =

British robotics company

- Type: Private
- Industry: Robotics
- Founded: 2002
- Founder: Antony Lovedale
- Headquarters: Chilcompton, Somerset, UK
- Products: Robots; Robotics kits Robot components and accessories
- Website: www.active-robots.com

Active Robots is a British company which sells robotics kits, components, accessories and parts.

== History ==
Active Robots was founded in 2002 and incorporated in 2003 by Antony Lovedale and his wife, Maggie. The company has over 3000 product lines.

Active Robots acquired Total Robots in 2009.

In 2013, the company created Active8 Robots, which provides robotic research technology to universities in the United Kingdom and Europe with the Baxter research robot and Nao humanoid robot.

According to companies house they were in liquidation in 2025

== Educational outreach ==
=== Primary and secondary ===
Active Robots has been involved in education in the United Kingdom for over 10 years. They have coordinated with education providers such as EDT to promote STEM enrichment. Events such as "Lego Robot Wars" and "Robot Gladiators" have been held in partnership with local educators. Active Robots has been called the best provider of robotics in education by the blog Total Education. Part of their outreach work has focused on primary school children, particularly girls, introducing them to robotics and engineering at a young age. Over 200 schools worldwide are using the Nao robot.

=== Higher education ===
The Baxter robot is being used in university research and teaching in the UK. At least 15 universities in the UK have used the Baxter robot.

== Press ==
Active Robots products have appeared on The Graham Norton Show, Gadget Man, The Gadget Show and ITV's Daybreak.

== See also ==
- Robotics
- Educational robotics
