= Ecovacs Robotics =

Chinese in-home robotics appliances company

- Formerly: TEK Electrical Company
- Type: Public
- Traded as: SSE: 603486
- Industry: Consumer electronics
- Founded: 1998; 28 years ago
- Founder: Qian Dongqi
- Headquarters: Suzhou, China
- Area served: Worldwide
- Key people: David Qian, President of the International Business Unit
- Products: Domestic robots; Service robots
- Website: www.ecovacs.com

Ecovacs Robotics (Chinese: 科沃斯; pinyin: Kēwòsī) is a Chinese technology company. It is best known for developing in-home robotic appliances. The company was founded in 1998 by Qian Dongqi and is headquartered in Suzhou, China. According to Global Asia, Ecovacs Robotics had more than 60% of the Chinese market for robots by 2013. In 2023, Nikkei Asia had reported that the market capitalisation of Ecovacs Robotics has grown to near $6.38 billion, which is "roughly 5 times" that of the market capitalisation of rivalling US based iRobot, who manufactures the Roomba.

== History ==
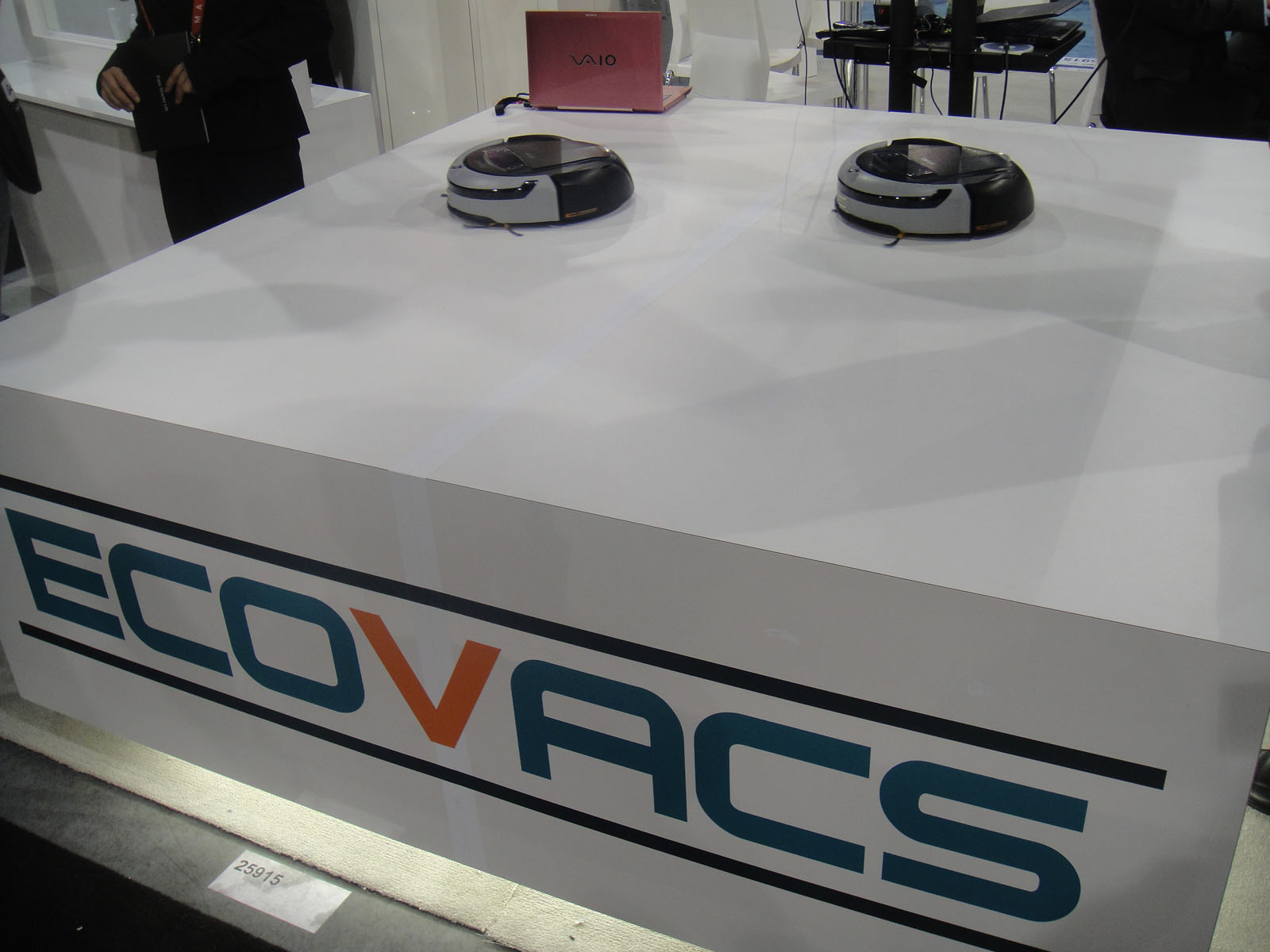
Ecovacs Robotics at CES 2012

In 1998, Qian Dongqi founded Ecovacs Robotics as an original equipment manufacturer for vacuum cleaners under the name TEK Electrical Company. The company rebranded in late 2006 as an independent manufacturer of robotic devices for home cleaning. By 2007, Ecovacs Robotics had introduced its floor cleaning Deebot series. The product was featured and had a recurring role on Real World: Skeletons in 2015.

From 2012 to 2014, Ecovacs Robotics expanded its operations with offices in the United States, Germany and Japan. The company also introduced products for mobile entertainment and security, air purification and window cleaning. Ecovacs Robotics collaborated and partnered with Marvel Entertainment for limited edition themed Deebots to coincide with the release of Captain America: Civil War.

At the 32nd DEF CON security conference in 2024, researchers presented documentation on significant vulnerabilities within Ecovac products, including the ability to remotely and silently record users within their homes by abusing unsecured Bluetooth connections. Ecovac did not acknowledge the report prior to publication by the researchers however, in a statement issued after the conference, Ecovac indicated that they would not issue software fixes for the associated vulnerabilities.

== Products ==
It produces the DEEBOT, a floor cleaning robot, ATMOBOT, an air purifying robot and WINBOT, a window cleaning robot. Deebot is a floor cleaning vacuum, which uses smart motion technology that guides the robot which can vacuum and wet mop floors. The Deebot has anti-drop and anti-collision sensors to navigate around objects for cleaning. Winbot is a window cleaning robot which debuted at the Consumer Electronics Show in Las Vegas. It suctions onto a vertical glass surface and cleans using microfiber pads and a squeegee. Ecovacs featured BENEBOT, a shopping assist robot, at the Consumer Electronics Show. In August 2016, Ecovacs released the UNIBOT, a smart robot with floor cleaning, home monitoring and air-purifying features. In 2021, Ecovacs release the DEEBOT T9+, a robotic vacuum which uses obstacle avoidance technology to avoid objects when cleaning, it also comes complete with an auto-empty station. The DEEBOT T9+ also includes OZMO 2.0 technology which operates a vibrating mop along with an airfreshener (scent: wild bluebell).

Ecovacs Robotics sells cordless stick vacuums under the brand Tineco.

== Recognition ==
The company was recognized by the Consumer Electronics Show for its solar panel cleaning robot, receiving the 2015 CES Innovation Award.

== See also ==
- Artificial Intelligence
- Autonomous research robot
- Domestic robot
- Home automation
