= Fastbrick Robotics =

Perth based robotics company

FBR Ltd
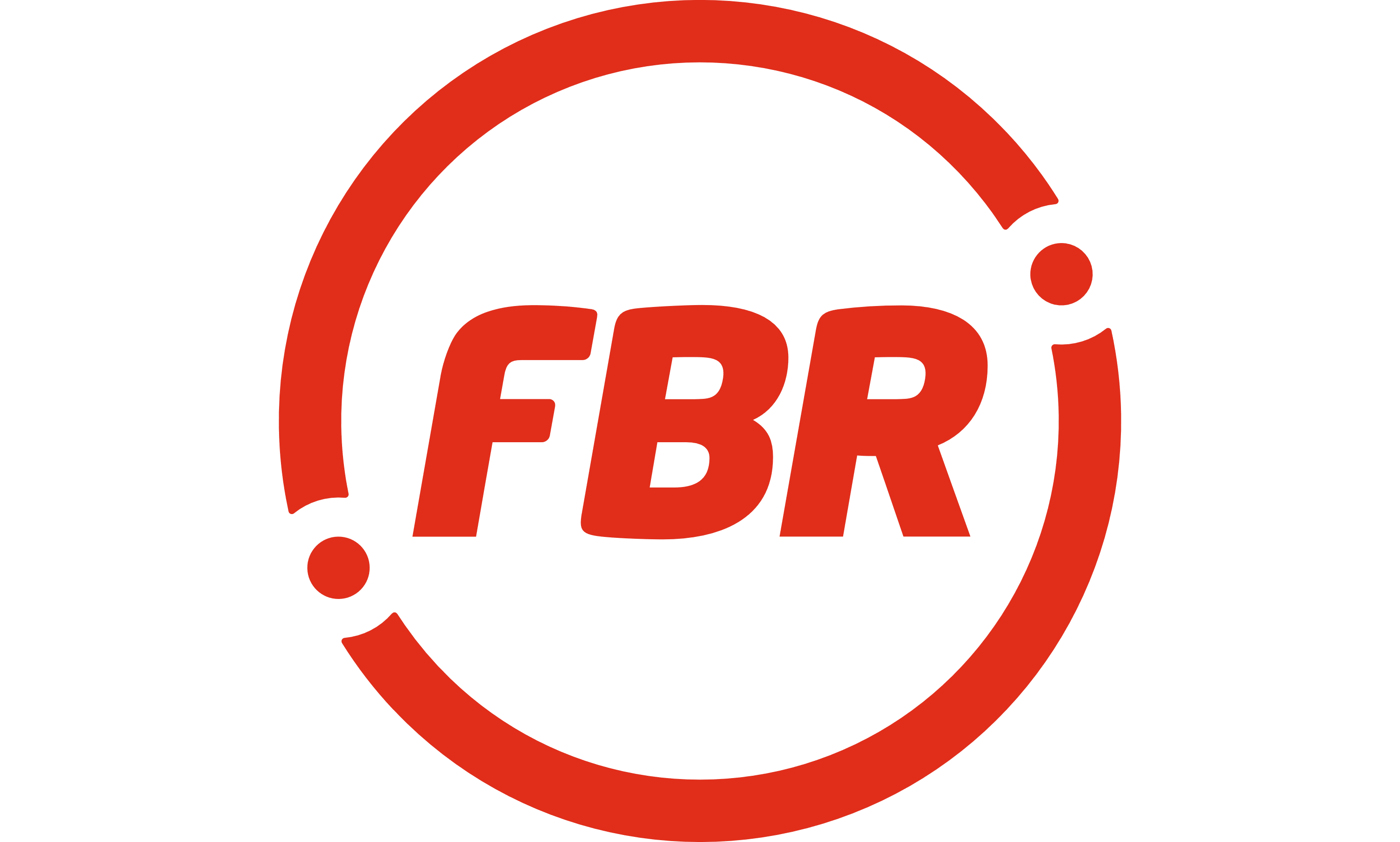
- Logo of FBR Ltd
- Type: Public
- Traded as: ASX:FBR
- Industry: Robotics
- Headquarters: Perth, Australia
- Area served: Worldwide
- Key people: Mike Pivac (CEO), Mark Pivac (CTO), Mark Sheridan (COO)
- Website: https://www.fbr.com.au

FBR Ltd (formerly Fastbrick Robotics Limited) (ASX:FBR) is a Perth-based robotics company. FBR is the creator of Hadrian X, the world's first fully automated end to end robotic bricklayer. In November 2016, Fastbrick Robotics won the Western Australian Innovator of the Year Award.

== History ==
In 1994, aeronautic and mechanical engineer Mark Pivac had the idea for a mobile dynamically stabilised robot. Between 2005 and 2008, Pivac filed patents for an 'automatic bricklaying system' and created the first Hadrian prototype using seed funding. After successfully demonstrating the build of a wall using ground mounted robots and mortar, production of Hadrian 105 (the precursor to Hadrian X) was under way.

After stalling during the 2008 financial crisis, development of the Hadrian 105 resumed in 2014, amid a stronger economy and renewed interest in robotic construction. The following year, Fastbrick Robotics was listed on the ASX.

== Overview ==
In September 2016, the Hadrian 105 built the world's first multi room block structure from a 3D CAD model with no human intervention, providing proof of concept for what would become Hadrian X, and signed a non binding and non exclusive framework agreement, with Perth-based builder Archistruct Builders & Designers.

In August 2017, Fastbrick Robotics moved to a new fit for purpose facility to allow a rapid expansion of their team, and signed an agreement with Kingdom of Saudi Arabia for a potential opportunity to build 50,000 new homes with Hadrian X, entered into a Memorandum of Understanding, with an initial twelve-month term, with Caterpillar Inc, which agreed to invest $2 million into the technology. and raised $35 million through a share placement.

In June 2018, the mechanical assembly of the first Hadrian X construction robot was completed. FBR signed a strategic collaboration with GP Vivienda to discuss a pilot programme for the Hadrian X in Mexico. In August 2018, Dynamic Stabilisation Technology testing on the layhead of the Hadrian X was completed. In September 2018, FBR signed a global partnership agreement with Wienerberger AG to develop, manufacture and test clay blocks optimised for Hadrian X.

In November 2018, Hadrian X built a three bedroom, two bathroom home structure in under three days. In February 2019, Hadrian X completed its first outdoor home structure, known as 'Build1'.

== Hadrian X ==
Work on Hadrian X commercial bricklaying robot, began in March 2015. In May 2015, Hadrian 105 demonstrator was completed, which had the bricklaying rate of 225 bricks per hour. Hadrian X is built from steel, aluminium and carbon fibre composite materials, and is said to have the bricklaying rate of one thousand bricks per hour.

According to the CEO Mike Pivac, the machine will be able to build with a high degree of accuracy, decrease wasted bricks and work twenty four hours a day in most weather, without having to stop for mortar to dry, since it uses polyurethane adhesive.

On 25 August 2020, Hadrian X completed the Pilot Program stage of the Building Pilot Program Agreement between FastBrick Robotics and GP Vivienda, four Mexican-style two bedroom, one-bathroom house structures were completed by the Hadrian X, according to FastBrick Robotics each house was completed in less than one standard shift on average to complete.

On 1 September 2020, Hadrian X began building its first non-residential commercial structure, the structure is located south east of Perth.

In 2022 FBR signed a Memorandum of Understanding with Liebherr to commercialise Hadrian X.

In February 2025, PulteGroup—one of America's largest homebuilders—piloted the Hadrian X robotic bricklaying system on a site in Florida, constructing an entire house in a single day.

== Recognition ==
Year	Award	Category	Result
2019	Edison Awards	Robotics	Won (Gold)
2018	The Urban Developer Awards	Excellence in Construction Innovation	Won
2017	iAwards National	Inspiration of the Year (Victorian State Government)	Won
2016	Western Australia Innovator of the Year	Overall Winner (Mitsubishi Corporation WA Innovator of the Year)	Won
2016	The Incite Awards (Supporting ICT Innovation in Western Australia)	Most Disruptive Technology	Won

== See also ==
- List of emerging technologies
