= CloudMinds =

Chinese cloud-based systems company

CloudMinds Technologies Co. Ltd
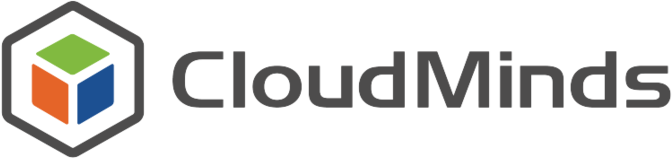
- Company type: Private
- Founded: March 2015; 11 years ago
- Founder: Bill Huang and Robert Zhang
- Headquarters: Beijing, China; Irvine, California
- Area served: Worldwide
- Key people: Bill Huang, Robert Zhang
- Products: Cloud connected smart machines, DATA, META, Mobile-intranet Cloud Services, XaaS Cloud, VBN
- Owner: Bill Huang
- Website: cloudminds.com

CloudMinds is an operator of cloud-based systems for cognitive robotics.

== History ==
CloudMinds was founded in 2015 and is backed by SoftBank, Foxconn, Walden Venture Investments, and Keytone Ventures. CloudMinds has developed research in smart devices, robot control, high-speed security networks, and cloud intelligence integration. CloudMinds developed the Mobile Intranet Cloud Services (MCS) based on these technologies in order to increase the information security of the cloud robot remote control. The technology has been applied in the fields of finance, medicine, the military, public safety, and large-scale manufacturing.

== U.S. sanctions ==
In May 2020, CloudMinds was added to the Bureau of Industry and Security's Entity List due to U.S. national security concerns.
