= Hahn (surname) =

Hahn is a German surname. It is usually derived from the German word Hahn for a rooster (often as a nickname of a proud, belligerent person), from Hagen (Middle High German for a thorn bush) or the related word Hain for a grove; either directly or as an origin name from localities named after those entities.

Notable people with the surname include:

- Alfred Hahn (1890–1964), American architect
- André Hahn, German footballer
- André Hahn (born 1963), German politician
- Archie Hahn (athlete) (1880–1955), American sprinter
- Archie Hahn (actor) (born 1941), American actor
- Arthur A. Hahn (1886–1959), American businessman and politician
- August Hahn (1792–1863), German Protestant theologian
- Bernard Hahn (1860–1931), American politician
- Billy Hahn (1955–2023), American basketball coach
- Bob Hahn (1925–2009), American basketball player
- Carl Hugo Hahn (1818–1895), German missionary in Namibia
- Carl Wilhelm Hahn (1898–1982), German journalist and historian
- Carl Wilhelm Hahn (1786–1835), German zoologist
- Dave Hahn (born 1961), American climber
- David Hahn, American known as the "Radioactive Boy Scout"
- David Hahn (American politician), American politician from Nebraska
- David Hahn (cartoonist), American cartoonist
- Dirk Meinerts Hahn (1804–1860), German ship's captain
- Don Hahn, American film producer
- Edith Hahn Beer (1914–2009), Jewish Holocaust survivor
- Erich Hahn (1891–1917), German flying ace
- Erwin Hahn (1921–2016), American physicist, nuclear magnetic resonance
- Florian Hahn (born 1974), German politician
- Frank Hahn (1925–2013), Cambridge economist
- Hans Hahn (mathematician) (1879–1934), Austrian mathematician
- Hans "Assi" Hahn (1914–1982), German World War II fighter ace
- Hans Hahn (night fighter pilot) (1919–1941), German World War II night fighter pilot
- Hans von Hahn (1912–1957), German World War II fighter pilot
- Hermann Hahn (architect), (1873–1921) German architect
- Hilary Hahn (born 1979), American violinist
- J. Jerome Hahn (died 1938), American judge from Rhode Island
- James Hahn (born 1950), American politician from California
- James Hahn (golfer), American golfer
- Janice Hahn, American politician
- Jerri Ariel Farias Hahn, Brazilian footballer
- Jessica Hahn (born 1959), American model and actress
- Jody Margolin Hahn, American television director
- Joe Hahn (born 1977), American musician, DJ, director and visual artist
- Johannes Hahn (born 1957), Austrian politician
- Johannes Samuel Hahn (1805-1883), German Protestant missionary
- Johannes Theophilus Hahn (1842-190), merchant and linguist in South West Africa
- Jörg-Uwe Hahn (born 1956), German politician
- Joseph Yuspa Nördlinger Hahn (died 1637), German rabbi
- Kathryn Hahn (born 1973), American actress
- Kenneth Hahn (1920–1997), American politician
- Kimberly Hahn (born 1957), Catholic author and apologist
- Kurt Hahn (1886–1974), German teacher and education reformer
- Lloyd Hahn (1898–1983), American middle-distance runner
- Marjorie Hahn (born 1948), American mathematician and tennis player
- Martín Hahn (born 1964), Venezuelan telenovelas writer
- Nikki Hahn (born 2002), American actress
- Otto Hahn (1879–1968), German nuclear chemist, discoverer of nuclear fission, Nobel Prize winner, founder of the Max-Planck-Society, peace activist
- Otto Hahn (petrologist) (1828–1904), German petrologist
- Paul Daniel Hahn (1849-1919), South African educational chemical analyst
- Peter Robert Hahn (born 1977), American nonprofit executive, professor and pianist.♦
- Philipp Matthäus Hahn (1739–1790), German priest and inventor
- Randy Hahn (born 1958), Canadian-American ice hockey announcer
- Reynaldo Hahn (1874–1947), Venezuelan-French composer
- Riley Hahn, MasterChef Junior contestant
- Rick Hahn (born 1971), American baseball executive
- Robert A. Hahn (born 1945), American medical anthropologist and epidemiologist
- Robert C. Hahn, American lawyer and politician
- Scott Hahn (born 1957), American Catholic writer and apologist
- Stephen Hahn (disambiguation)
  - Stephen Hahn (art dealer) (1921–2011), American art dealer and collector
  - Stephen Hahn (oncologist) (born 1960), American physician and FDA Commissioner
  - Steven Hahn (born 1951), American academic historian
- Svenja Hahn (born 1989), German politician
- Walter (wrestler) (born 1987), Austrian wrestler
- William Hahn (1829–1887), German painter
- William John Hahn (1841–1902), American lawyer and politician
- Wolfgang Hahn (1911–1998), German mathematician

== See also ==
- Han (Chinese surname)
- Han (Korean surname)
- Von Hahn
