= Hanneman =

Hannemann, or variant Hanneman, is a German surname.

== People with the surname Hannemann ==
- Dirk Hannemann (born 1970), German footballer
- Felix Hanemann (born 1953), American singer and musician
- Hans-Joachim Hannemann (1915–1989), German rower
- Inge Hannemann (born 1968), German blogger
- Jacob Hannemann (born 1991), American baseball player
- Johann Ludwig Hannemann (1640–1724), professor of medicine
- Karl Hannemann (1895–1953), German film actor
- Micah Hannemann (born 1994), American football player
- Mufi Hannemann (born 1954), American politician
- Nephi Hannemann (1945–2018), Samoan-American actor and singer
- Raik Hannemann (born 1968), German swimmer
- René Hannemann (born 1968), German bobsledder
- Walter Hannemann (May 2, 1912 – April 29, 2001) was an American film editor

== People with the surname Hanneman ==
- Adriaen Hanneman (c. 1603–1671), Dutch Golden Age painter
- Charles Bennett "Chuck" Hanneman (1914 –1999), American football player
- Craig Hanneman (born 1949), American football player
- Janet Hanneman McNulty (1936–2019), American nurse and Peace Corps volunteer
- Jeffrey John Hanneman (1964 – 2013), American founding member of the metal band Slayer
- Logan Hanneman (born 1993), American cross-country skier
- Paul Hanneman (1936–2017), American politician and member of the Oregon House of Representatives
- Reese Hanneman (born 1989), American cross-country skier
- Tom Hanneman (1952–2020), American sport reporter, announcer and analyst

== See also ==
- Hahn (disambiguation)
- Hahne
- Hahnemann (disambiguation)
- Hanne
