= Hahn =

Hahn may refer to:

== Places ==
- Hahn (crater), on the Moon
- Hahn (Holzhausen), a hill in Hesse, Germany
- Hahn, Rhineland-Palatinate, a municipality in Germany
  - Hahn Air Base, a former frontline NATO facility near Hahn
  - Frankfurt–Hahn Airport
- Hahn, Texas, U.S.

== Businesses ==
- The Hahn Company, a defunct American shopping center owner and developer
- Hahn Group, a German industrial company
- Hahn Brewery, a brewery in Sydney, Australia
- Hahn Fire Apparatus, a defunct American manufacturer of fire engines and buses

== People ==
- Hahn (surname), a German surname (including a list of people with the name)
- Ida, Countess von Hahn-Hahn (1805–1880), German author
- von Hahn, the name of the German-Baltic-Russian noble family

== Other uses ==
- Hahn series, a mathematical formal infinite series
- Hahn–Banach theorem, theory in functional analysis

== See also ==
- Han (disambiguation)
- Hann (disambiguation)
- Hahne
