= Baxter (robot) =

Industrial robot

Baxter robot
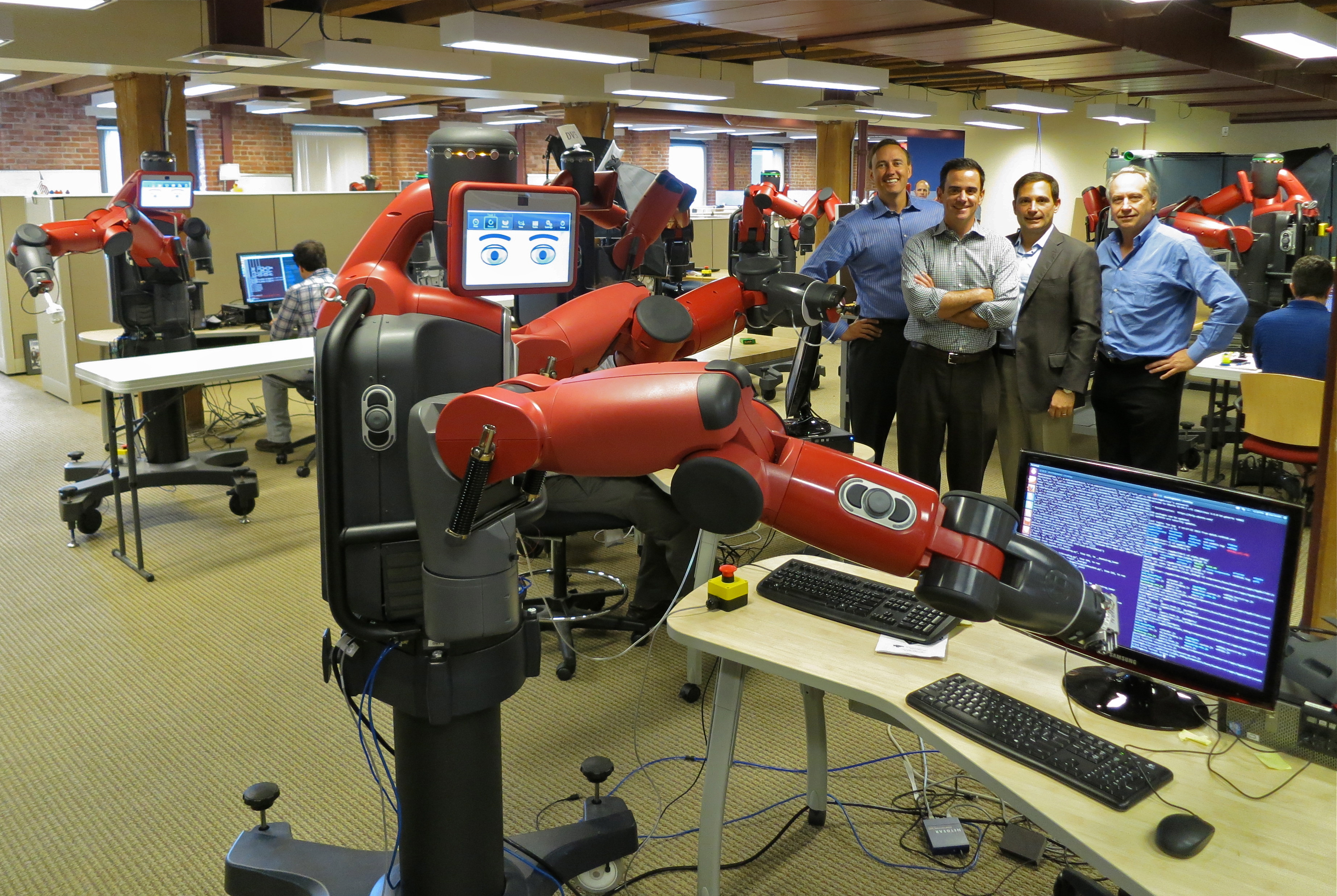
- Baxter robot demonstration at Rethink Robotics, 2013. Rodney Brooks is at the right in the lineup behind the robot.
- Manufacturer: Rethink Robotics
- Year of creation: 2012
- Type: Industrial robot
- Purpose: Simple industrial jobs
- Website: rethinkrobotics.com

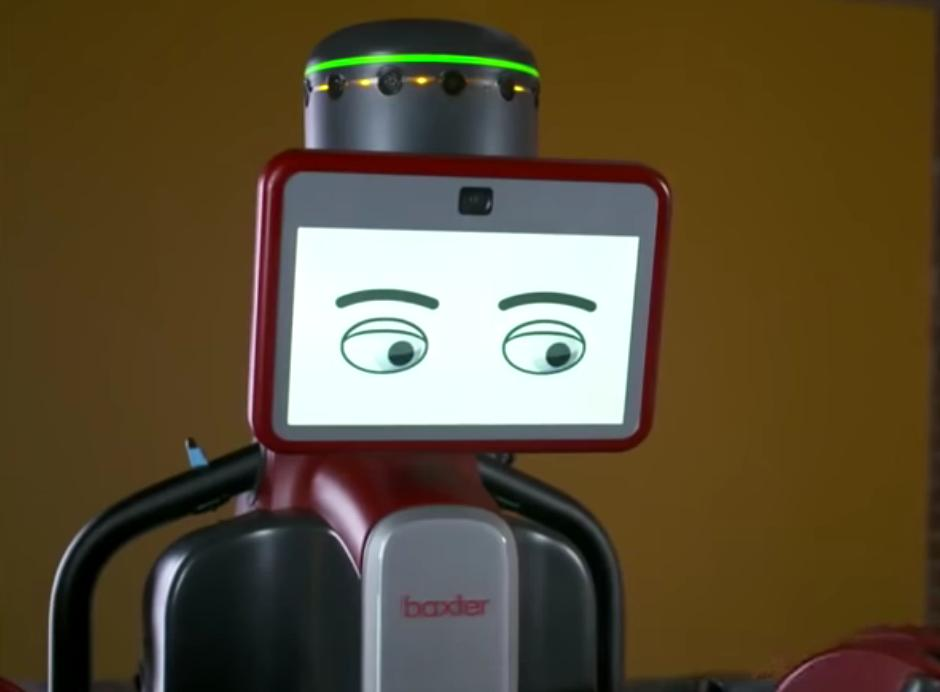
Bust of Baxter

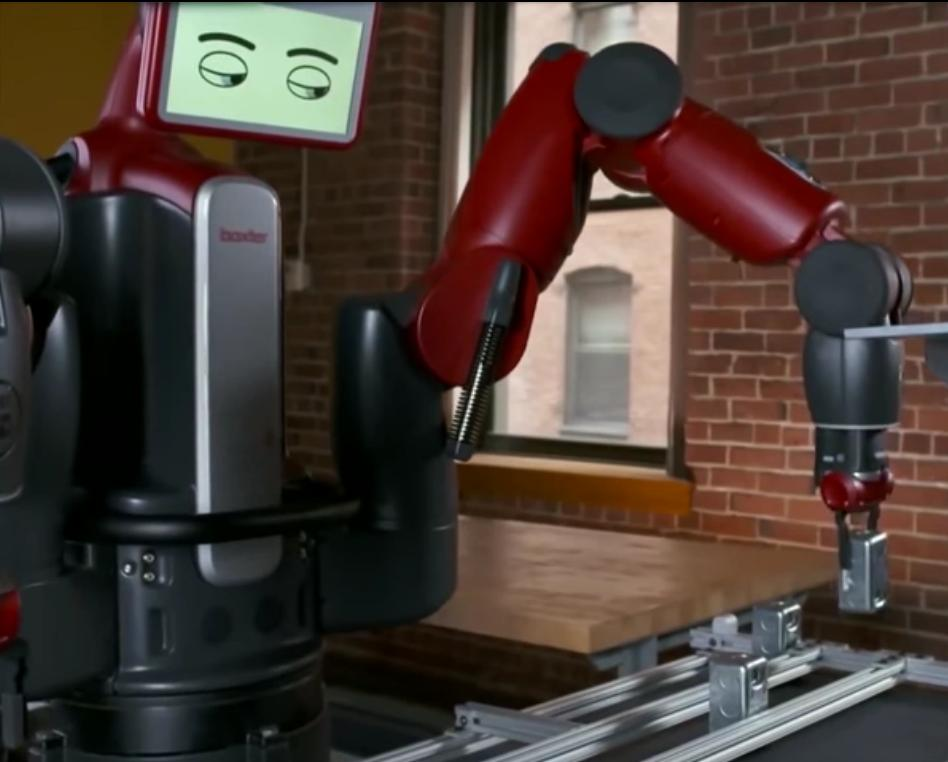
Baxter working

Baxter is an industrial robot first built on 22 September 2011 by Rethink Robotics, a start-up company founded by Rodney Brooks. The robot is a two-armed collaborative robot with an animated face.

It is three feet tall and weighs 165 pounds without its pedestal; with its pedestal, it is between five feet and ten inches to six feet and three inches tall and weighs 306 pounds. It is designed for simple industrial jobs such as loading, unloading, sorting, and handling of materials. It is intended to be sold to small and medium-sized companies.

The robot’s production was discontinued in 2018 following underwhelming sales to commercial customers, but it remains notable in the robotics research field for its safety features and human-robot interaction capabilities. Industry experts remarked on the impact it had on advancing collaborative robotic technology.

== Technology ==
Baxter has an animated screen for a "face" that allows it to display multiple facial expressions determined by its current status. There are sets of sensors on its head that allow it to sense people nearby and give Baxter the ability to adapt to its environment, unlike other industrial robots which will either shut down or continue running incorrectly when their environment changes. For example, if it drops a tool without which it cannot do its job, Baxter will stop working, unlike some other robots, which will attempt to perform their job without the proper tools. Baxter runs on the open-source Robot Operating System on a regular, personal computer which is in its chest. Baxter can be placed on a four-legged pedestal with wheels to become mobile. Baxter also has many sensors in its hands.

== Teaching Baxter ==
As opposed to traditional robots, which are programmed to follow a specific set of commands, Baxter can be programmed by moving its hand to perform a task whose motions the computer will then memorize and be able to repeat; as such, the bot can be programmed by ordinary workers, without the need of an expert being present. Extra dials, buttons, and controls are available on Baxter's arm for more precision and features.

== Research ==
Baxter robot manipulating different objects

Tracking view from Baxter's camera

Many universities are now using Baxter as a part of their courses in robotics, mechanical engineering, and computational sciences. Baxter provides many advantages over traditional robots in that no cages are required for its use, and students can work alongside it in a classroom environment without the potential for accidents. This feature is also useful for Baxter's application in commercial usage. Researchers are now using Baxter to try to find solutions to current problems being faced by Ebola workers in West Africa to create a robotic solution to reduce the risk of infection for aid workers. Currently, the head-mounted camera, sonar head sensors, and IR hand lighting is only available for use on the Research Robot model of Baxter.

== Safety ==
Other industrial robots are built to perform one task rapidly with many fast-moving parts that make them unsafe for working alongside humans. Baxter has sensors in its hands and around its arms allowing it to detect and adapt to its surroundings. This enables it to sense potential collision events early and can reduce the force before the impact. This is due to a motor driving a spring that drives Baxter's arm instead of just a motor driving its arms. Extra sensors and cameras within Baxter's hands allow it to pay attention to detail while working with its hands. These extra sensors and abilities make Baxter less hazardous.

== Controversy ==
Skeptics are concerned about the introduction of Baxter into production lines, and think Baxter takes away low-wage manual labor jobs. On the other hand, supporters argue that Baxter does not take jobs because humans are still needed to supervise and teach Baxter to perform tasks.

According to Brooks, Baxter is not a threat to human jobs because Baxter's ability is limited in tasks such as quality assurance or small assembly where things like sensing tension are important. In those cases, a human is unlikely to be replaced by robots like Baxter.
