= Stephen Hahn (disambiguation) =

Stephen Hahn is an American physician who served as the Commissioner of Food and Drugs from 2019 to 2021.

Stephen Hahn may also refer to:

- Stephen Hahn (art dealer) (1921–2011), American art dealer and collector
- Stephen Hahn, president of the Schell Leather Company
- Stephen Hahn, CEO of the Joy 94.9 station
- Stephen Hahn, a character in The Flight of the Dove portrayed by Lane Smith

== See also ==
- Steven Hahn (born 1951), professor of history at New York University
