= Hahne =

Hahne is a German surname. Notable people with the surname include:

- Hans Hahne (archaeologist) (1875–1935), German medical doctor and archaeologist
- Hans Hahne (general) (1894–1944), German general
- Hendrik Hahne (born 1986), German footballer
- Hubert Hahne (1935–2019), racing driver

== See also ==
- C. Hahne Mühlenwerke GmbH & Co. KG, a German company producing cereals
- Hahne and Company, an American department store chain
- Hahnemühle, a German company producing paper
- Hahn (disambiguation)
- Hanneman
