= Johannes Theophilus Hahn =

South African merchant and linguist (1842–1905)

Johannes Theophilus Hahn (Ebenhaeser, Cape Colony, 24 December 1842 – Johannesburg, Transvaal, 22 January 1905) was a South African merchant, agent, and librarian in South West Africa (SWA). He was considered a linguistic expert on the Khoikhoi language, one of seven languages in which he was fluent.

== Youth ==
Hahn was the third child of the Rhenish Missionary Johannes Samuel Hahn and Helene Langenbeck. He spent his first six years at the mission Eben-Ezer in the Western Cape, until 1848, when the family moved to Bethanie in Great Namaqualand (now South West Africa. He spoke Khoikhoi, the language of the Nama, like a second mother tongue. In 1849, he was sent to school in Barmen, (Germany), the Rhenish Missionary headquarters. When his father retired in 1852, Hahn lived at the family home there, but never forgot his time in Namaland.

== Higher education ==
Hahn at first planned to return to SWA to work as a surveyor and cartographer, but after his vocational training he decided to return to the subject of the Nama, spending four years at the Martin Luther University of Halle-Wittenberg studying linguistics with professor August Pott, a pioneering researcher on the comparative grammar of Bantu languages. During his studies, he began contributing linguistic and ethnographic papers to German journals: Die Nama-Hottentotten: ein Beitrag zur südafrikanischen Ethnographie ("The Nama: A Contribution to Southern African Ethnography), Globus XII (Dresden, 1867); Sagen und Märchen der Ova-Herero in Südafrika ("Proverbs and Folktales of the Ovaherero in Southern Africa"), Globus XIII (Dresden, 1868); Ein Raunkampf in der nördlichen Kap-Kolonie ("A Gossip War in Northern Cape Colony"), Globus XIV, nos. 7 and 8 (Dresden, 1868); Beiträge zur Kunde von den Hottentotten, Jahresberichte des Vereins für Erdkunde ("Contributions on the Customs of the Khoikhoi, Annual Report of the Dresden Geographical Society") (Dresden, 1868/69); Die Buschmänner: ein Beitrag zur südafrikanischen Völkerkunde ("The San: A Contribution to Southern African Ethnology"), Globus XVIII (Dresden, 1870); Der hottentottische Tsui-ǁgoab und der Indogermanische Zeus, Zeitschrift der Gesellschaft für Erdkunde ("The Khoikhoi Tsui-ǁgoab and the Indo-European Zeus, Journal of the Berlin Geographical Society") (Berlin, 1870). He matriculated from Halle in 1870 with his dissertation Die Sprache der Nama; nebst einem Anhang enthaltend Sprachproben aus dem Munde des Volkes ("The Language of the Nama: with an Appendix Featuring Sample Dialogue from the Mouths of the People") (Leipzig, 1870).

He spent many of his vacations at Schloss Poschwitz of the Privy Councillor Hans Conon von der Gabelentz, a colleague of Pott's, who owned an excellent collection of publications on Africa.

Hahn understood, besides the Nama and Herero languages, German, English, Dutch, Latin, and Greek. There is evidence that he was corresponding quite early with colleagues such as C.F. Wuras and Wilhelm Bleek. After finishing his doctorate, he stayed briefly in the Cape where he married Marianne Esther de la Roche Smuts, daughter of Cornelius Smuts, M.D.; the marriage produced two sons and a daughter, who died in infancy.

== Return to South West Africa ==
In 1871, he returned to SWA, settling among the ǁHawoben tribe of Nama (known by the colonials as Velskoendraers or Veldschoendragers, translating to "wearers of pelt shoes") in Keetmanshoop. He tried to make a living trading with them, but failed due to constant inter-tribal warfare. Observing that trade would never develop there without government intervention, he sent a letter to the Cape Colony magistrate in Springbok, Northern Cape on 21 October 1872, statistically outlining the lucrative trade between the Cape Colony and claiming it could be doubled were the Cape colonial authorities to pacify the area. Receiving no response, Hahn moved north to Rehoboth, where he sought more reliable shelter among the mixed-race Baster population.

Both found it difficult to submit to the authority of the Baster Council and objected to the annual $25 tariff and the smaller local tax. They refused to pay more than half of it, and insisted that half of the court that settled disputes between Basters and whites should be white. The immediate cause of the controversy was Hahn's written invitation to Transvaal Boer hunter Hendrik van Zyl and his associates in Ghansies to settle east of Rehoboth, in which Hahn told Van Zyl 40–50 settlers could easily take control of the area and alleged already inviting farmers from the Kamiesberg hills to settle in northern Namaland when he met them on a business trip to Cape Town.

When Hahn's actions came to light, Captain Hermanus van Wyk and his fellow members of the Baster Council ordered Hahn and Steyn to leave. The temperamental Hahn immediately appealed in a letter to the chief of the ǁKhauǀgoan (called by white settlers the Swartbooi Nama), who once had occupied the Basters' land, asking him to leave as well. Cooler heads prevailed, and no action was taken against Hahn. Meanwhile, his letter had reached Maharero, paramount chief of the Herero, who was up in arms at the prospect of a Boer invasion of Damaraland. He summoned Hahn to Okahandja to explain his actions, but Hahn bluntly refused to and asked Maharero to pay him debt.

Maharero and other chiefs then petitioned the Cape government for protection. In response, Special Commissioner William Coates Palgrave was sent to SWA to discuss protectorate possibilities with the chiefs, the famed Palgrave Commission. Palgrave, for his part, was disappointed in Hahn's disrespectful treatment of the natives and opposition to a British protectorate in the Transgariep.

== Move to Cape Colony ==
Hahn thought it prudent to leave SWA in 1878. He moved to Stellenbosch, where his older brother, Johannes Samuel Hahn Jr., was headmaster of the Rhenish Missionary School. There, Hahn surveyed the first map of SWA Original map of Namaqualand and Damaraland (Cape Town, 1879). On the recommendation of the renowned German linguist Max Müller, Hahn was appointed on 1 February 1881, as the "royal philologist" and curator of the Sir George Grey Collection in what is now the National Library of South Africa campus in Cape Town, in which capacity he cataloged its contents as An index to the Grey collection in the South African public library (Cape Town, 1884). Despite severe bibliographic flaws and multiple errors, it was used for decades as a basic catalog to supplement Bleek's 1858 one.

Several scholarly works he produced during this period derive from his second period in SWA: The graves of Heitsi-eibib: a chapter on the prehistoric Hottentot race, Cape Monthly Magazine, XVI (1878); Tsuni-ǁGoam, The Supreme Being of the Khoi-Khoi (London, 1881); Early African exploration, up to the end of the 16th century (Cape Town, 1882), and On the science of language and its study with special regard to South Africa (Cape Town, 1882), and his address from 29 April 1882, in Cape Town to the 53rd annual members' conference of the South African Public Library. He contributed heavily to the report of the 1883 Cape Government Commission on Native Laws and Customs, displaying his familiarity with the Nama way of life. Perhaps a better scholar and researcher than librarian, he was dismissed by Charles Aken Fairbridge and other members of the library committee on 30 November 1883.

While living in Cape Town, he once again participated in historical events. He gave valuable information on SWA's commercial potential to the young Heinrich Vogelsang, who was securing the first land concessions in SWA for the firm of Adolf Lüderitz, helping Vogelsang buy the Angra Pequena (now Lüderitz Bay) by recommending his bona fides to Josef Frederiks II, owner of that area and chief of the ǃAman Nama based in Bethanie.

During his years in Stellenbosch, Hahn was disillusioned with a lack of equipment and funds for his surveying work. The lean years in Stellenbosch yielded his brochure Viticulture in South Africa: a scheme for the development of the Cape wine industry (London, 1888).

== Final years ==
Throughout 1889, Hahn worked in SWA as an agent for the Kharaskhoma Exploring and Prospecting Syndicate to acquire land and mineral rights to the territory of the Bondelswarts and the Velskoendraers along with the area of Swartmodder (now Keetmanshoop). This gave him the money in Stellenbosch to buy the home of a physician, Dr. Hanf, at the foot of Papegaaiberg on the road to Lynedoch. Despite the help of his son Roderick, his farming venture failed; his wife died in 1895, and he went bankrupt in 1898. After the Second Boer War, he made a meager living working for a mining company until he died of cancer.

== Personality and assessment ==
Many of his problems could be attributed to his high-strung, pretentious character, which annoyed even his own family. His research brought him acclaim abroad and membership in famed scientific societies such as the aforementioned Geographical Societies of Dresden and Berlin and the Anthropological Society of Vienna, but he was not a scholar of substance. His conclusions and theories in Tsuni-ǁGoam, The Supreme Being of the Khoi-Khoi and On the Science of Language have not held up to scrutiny, especially in the latter, in which he reveals his antipathy toward what he called "the Dutch patois in this Colony." On the other hand, his writings on the culture of the Khoikhoi and San are seminal to Westerners' understanding of these peoples, and he was among the first to study San attitudes toward the Boophone disticha, a medicinal herb with local spiritual connotations.

Some of his books and writings are in the collection of the Ferdinand Postma Library at the Potchefstroom University for Christian Higher Education. Photos of him can be found in the album collection of the National Library. South African College professor Paul Daniel Hahn was his brother.

== See also ==
- Wilhelm Bleek
- Lucy Lloyd

== Sources ==
- (af) De Kock, W.J. 1968. Suid-Afrikaanse Biografiese Woordeboek part I. Cape Town: Nasionale Boekhandel Beperk, namens die Nasionale Raad vir Sosiale Navorsing, Departement van Hoër Onderwys.
- His life story. Retrieved 17 May 2016.
- Short biographical sketch. Retrieved 17 May 2016.
