= Hahnemann =

Hahnemann, or variant Hahneman, is a German surname.

== People ==
Notable people with the surname include:

- Elizabeth Cuthill, née Hahnemann (1923–2011), American mathematician
- Frederick Hahneman (1922–1991), Honduras-born American hijacker
- Helga Hahnemann (1937–1991), East German actress
- Marcus Hahnemann (born 1972), American soccer player
- Mélanie Hahnemann (1800–1878), French physician
- Paul G. Hahnemann (1912–1997), German automobile industry manager
- Samuel Hahnemann (1755−1843), German physician, founder of homeopathy
- Wilhelm Hahnemann (1914−1991), Austrian-German football player and coach

== Medical-related facilities ==
All in the United States

- Hahnemann Hospital (Worcester), in Worcester, Massachusetts
- Hahnemann Medical College of the Pacific, in San Francisco, California
- Hahnemann University Hospital, in Philadelphia, Pennsylvania
  - Hahnemann University, a Philadelphia-based institution, precursor to Drexel University College of Medicine

== See also ==
- Hahnaman, Illinois, an unincorporated community in Whiteside County
- Hanneman (disambiguation), a German surname
