= Schell =

Schell is a surname. Notable people with the surname include:

- Albert and Charles Schell, founders of Schell Leather Company
- Baron Boris Fitinhof-Schell (1829–1901), Russian composer
- Brad Schell (born 1984), Canadian ice hockey player
- Daniel Schell (born 1980), Australian rules footballer
- Desiree Schell, Canadian skeptic
- Catherine Schell (born 1944), actress
- Gaea Schell
- Harry Schell
- Jacob Thomas Schell
- Jesse Schell
- Jonathan Schell
- Jordu Schell
- Jozef Schell
- Judit Schell
- Maria Schell (1926–2005), Austrian-Swiss actress
- Maximilian Schell (1930–2014), Swiss actor, theatre director, filmmaker, and musician of Austrian origin
- Mort Schell (born 1943), Australian politician
- Orville Schell
- Paul Schell
- Roger R. Schell
- Ronnie Schell (1931–2026), American actor and stand-up comedian
- Richardson W. Schell (born 1951), School Headmaster

== See also ==
- August Schell Brewing Company
- North Schell Peak
- Schell City, Missouri
- Schell Creek Range
- Shell (disambiguation)
