= Marilynn Alsdorf =

American art collector and philanthropist

Marilynn Alsdorf (née Bruder, 1925 - August 1, 2019) was an American art collector, philanthropist and museum trustee from Chicago.

== Early life ==
Marilynn Alsdorf, née Bruder, was born in 1925 and grew up in the Rogers Park area on the Far North Side of Chicago. After high school at the St. Scholastica Academy, she graduated from Northwestern University Medill School of Journalism.

In 1953 she married James Alsdorf. Together, they operated Alsdorf International Ltd., an export and investment business. James died in 1990.

== Art collector and philanthropist ==
Alsdorf collected art with her husband. Their collection included 20th-century European paintings, antiquities, and Indian, Himalayan and Southeast Asian art. In September 1997, Alsdorf gave 400 works of Asian art to the Art Institute of Chicago, of which she was a trustee. She was both a founding board member and trustee for over 50 years, as well as a donor to the Museum of Contemporary Art Chicago. She also donated to the University of Chicago’s Smart Museum of Art.

== Looted art controversies ==
In 2004 the FBI seized from Alsdorf a painting by Pablo Picasso, Femme en Blanc, that had been owned by Carlotta Landsberg and that was suspected of having been looted or sold under duress during the Nazi era. A settlement was reached in 2005 after years of litigation.

Over the years concerns have been raised about the origins of antiquities in the Alsdorf collection, notably concerning artworks from Nepal. In 2023, Crain's Chicago Business and ProPublica reported that nine objects from the James and Marilynn Alsdorf collection had been returned by the museum to their countries of origin since the late 1980s. In 2025, arrangements were made to return additional works to Nepal.

== Legacy ==
Alsdorf died in 2019 at the age of 94. In 2020 Christie's auctioned 60 objects from the Alsdorf home in Chicago.

== Lawsuits ==
- Bennigson v. Alsdorf

== See also ==
- List of claims for restitution for Nazi-looted art
- Stephen Hahn
- Reichsleiter Rosenberg Taskforce
- Matthew Bogdanos
