= URDF =

Computer format representing a robot model

- Filename extension: .URDF
- Developed by: Robot Operating System
- Type of format: XML
- Website: wiki.ros.org/urdf

URDF, Unified Robot Description Format is an XML format for representing a robot model. URDF is commonly used in Robot Operating System (ROS) tools such as rviz (Ros Visualization tool) and Gazebo simulator. The model consists of links and joints motion.
