= Pilgerbach =

River in Germany

Location
- Country: Germany
- State: Hesse

Physical characteristics
- Source
  - location: Bilstein
  - coordinates: 51°13′49″N 9°21′38″E
  - elevation: 320 m (1,050 ft)
- Mouth
  - location: at Edermünde-Grifte into the Eder
  - coordinates: 51°12′44″N 9°21′13″E
  - elevation: 144 m (472 ft)
- Length: 8 km (5.0 mi)
- Basin size: 25,593 km^{2} (9,882 sq mi)

Basin features
- Progression: Eder→ Fulda→ Weser→ North Sea
- Tributaries
  - left: Hertingshausener Bach (4.5 km)
  - right: Saugraben (3.2 km long), Glisborn (3.2 km long)

Pilgerbach is a 8-kilometre-long (5.0 mi) river of north Hesse, Germany, in the district of Edermünde. It is a westerly tributary of the Eder into which it flows near Edermünde-Grifte, just before the Eder flows into the Fulda. The name Pilgerbach can be translated in English as Pilgrim's stream.

== Course ==
The Pilgerbach rises in the nature park of the Habichtswald near Kassel. The spring is on the eastern flank of the 464.8-metre-high (1,525 ft) Benberg hill and the northern flank of the 460-metre-high (1,510 ft) Bilstein hill, ca. 1.5 km (0.93 mi) northwest of Besse.

After leaving the forest, the river flows through arable land to the south-west of Besse, before it passes the westerly and southern parts of the same town and leaves the nature park. At this point the Saugraben tributary meets the Pilgerbach from the west. As it flows further eastwards it passes mainly arable and pasture land. Next to the L3221 road it reaches the basalt knoll Hahn before passing through Edermünde-Holzhausen. On the western edge of this village it meets the Glisborn tributary, which comes from the southwest. After passing under the Autobahn A49 it meets the tributary of the Hertingshausener Bach, and flows next to the L3221 road to the town of Grifte. In this village it flows partly through tunnels and canals. After passing under the railway track, just to the east of Grifte, it flows in to the Eder river, which in turn flows in the Fulda in just 550 m (1,800 ft) further on.

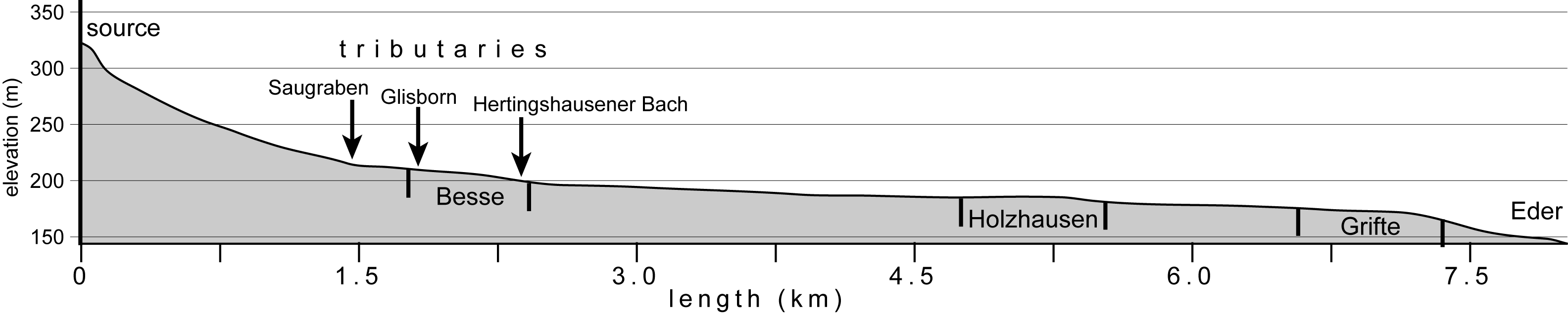
River profile of the Pilgerbach

== See also ==
- List of rivers of Hesse
