= Glisborn =

River in Germany

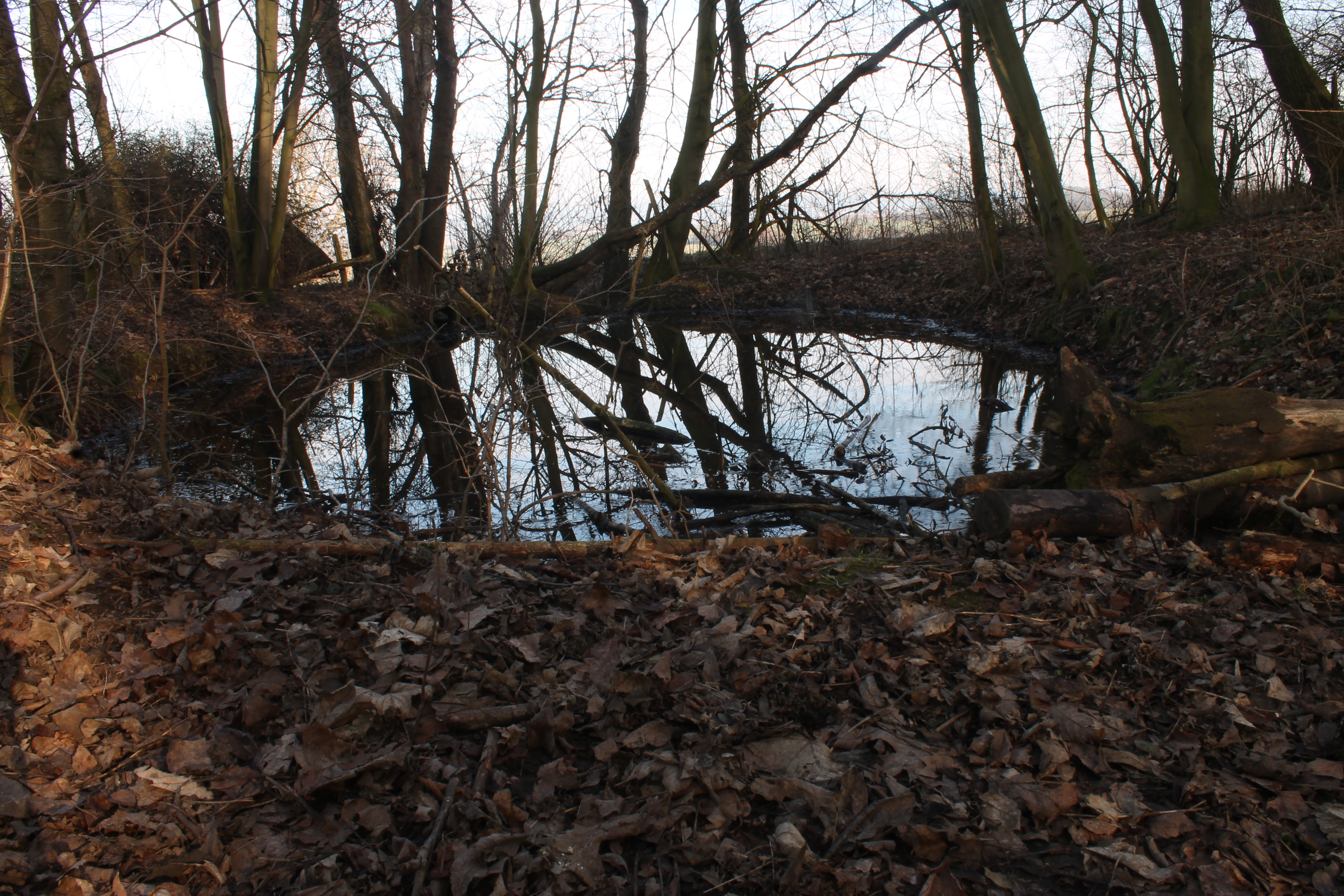
- Pool in front of the Glisborn spring

Location
- Country: Germany
- State: Hesse

Physical characteristics
- Source
  - location: Odenberg
  - coordinates: 51°12′00″N 9°23′01″E
  - elevation: 233 m (764 ft)
- Mouth
  - location: at Edermünde-Holzhausen in to the Pilgerbach
  - coordinates: 51°12′54″N 9°24′50″E
  - elevation: 182 m (597 ft)
- Length: 3.0 km (1.9 mi)

Basin features
- Progression: Pilgerbach→ Eder→ Fulda→ Weser→ North Sea

The Glisborn, or Glißborn, is a small, short (3 kilometres (1.9 mi)) stream that rises from a spring of the same name. The spring is located close to the Odenberg hill near Gudensberg in the northern Hessian district of Schwalm-Eder-Kreis. The spring is connected with numerous legends (see below).

== Course ==
The Glisborn spring is situated 650 metres (2,130 ft) m north of the summit of the Odenberg hill and 1,100 metres (3,600 ft) northwest of Scharfenstein hill, at an elevation of 233 metres (764 ft). The spring water flows directly in to a large pool (see photo) before emptying into the stream. Its very short course of 3 kilometres (1.9 mi) flows through arable land and then into the Pilgerbach stream near Edermünde-Holzhausen at an elevation of 182 metres (597 ft). This gives an average gradient of 1.7%.

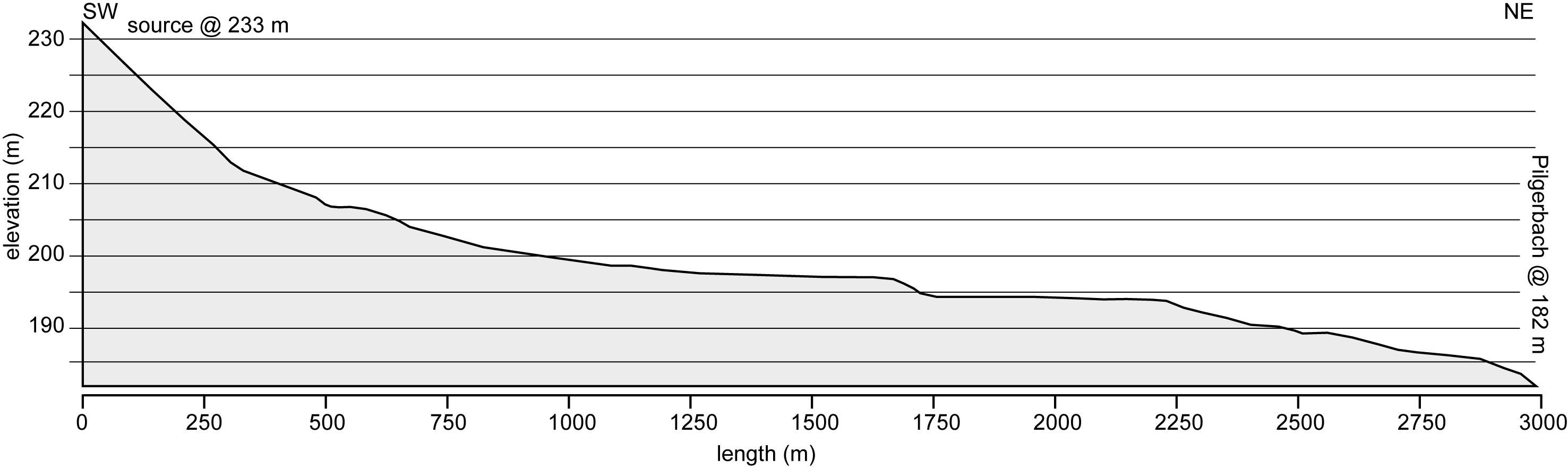
Profile of the Glisborn stream

== Legends ==
The first written versions of legends about the Glisborn were recorded by the Brothers Grimm.

Karl der Große .... Die Krieger schmachteten vor Durst, der König saß auf schnee-weißem Schimmel; da trat das Pferd mit dem Huf auf den Boden und schlug einen Stein vom Felsen, aus der Öfnung sprudelte die Quelle mächtig. Das ganze Heer wurde getränkt. Diese Quelle heißt Glisborn, ihrer kühlen, klaren Flut mißt das Landvolk größere Reinigungskraft bei als gewöhnlichem Wasser, und aus umliegenden Dörfern gehen die Weiber dahin ihr Leinen zu waschen.

— Jacob Grimm, Deutsche Mythologie, Band 2, 1884 p.890

Charlemagne .... His warriors pined with thirst, the king sat on a snow-white steed; then the horse stomped with his hoof on the ground and broke away a piece of rock; out of the opening gushed a bubbling spring and the whole army was watered. Glisborn is the name of the spring, to whose clear cold flood the country-folk impute a higher cleansing power than to common water, and women from surrounding villages come to wash their linen there.

— Jacob Grimm (transl. James Steven Stallybrass), Teutonic Mythology, 4th Edition, 1883, p.938

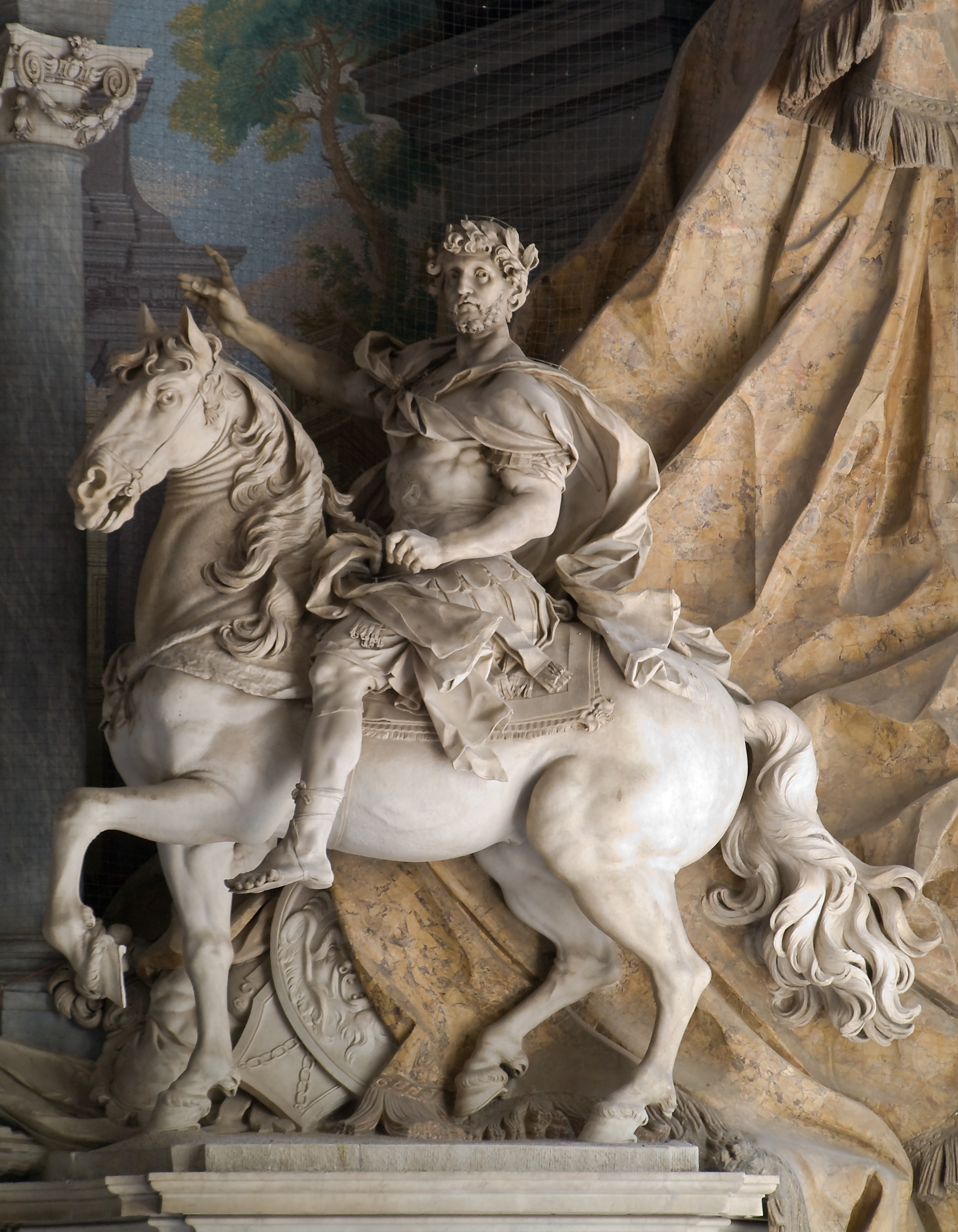
Statue of Charlemagne by Agostino Cornacchini (1725), St. Peter's Basilica, Vatican, Italy

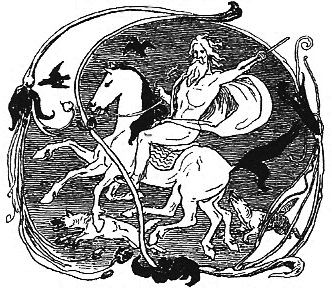
Odin sits atop his steed Sleipnir, his ravens Huginn and Muninn and wolves Geri and Freki nearby, by Lorenz Frølich (1895).

It is, however, most probable that this legend is based on an older Chatti legend which states that the god Odin came riding from the Odenberg on his white, eight-legged horse Sleipnir. At every hoof-fall of the horse, a spring arose, such as the Glisborn.

For this reason the Chatti held the Glisborn sacred. After the Chatti were Christianised in the 8th Century by Saint Boniface, the legend was changed to the Charlemagne story. Both variants of the legend are "supported" by a stone with the imprint of a horse's hoof that was embedded in the wall of a church (Karlskirche) in Karlskirchen, a long abandoned village nearby. During the Protestant Reformation in the Landgraviate of Hesse in the year 1526, the church was destroyed because it was also still used for certain pagan practices. Many years later this stone was cemented into the wall that surrounds the St. Margarethen church in Gudensberg, where it can be still seen today.

== Water quality ==
In 2010, the water at Glisborn was found to have a total nitrate content above 50 mg/L, which is the maximum value that is allowed in drink water by German law (Trinkwasserschutzverordnung) and European drinking water quality standards. The Hessian Water Authority have stated that in a study from 1994 it was found that the soil around Glisborn is composed of thick loess deposits in various states of weathering. The high nitrate values are caused by natural loess decomposition and are not due to farming practice.

== See also ==
- List of rivers of Hesse
