= Johannes Samuel Hahn =

Johannes Samuel Hahn (Teutschenthal, 12 March 1805 – Stellenbosch, Cape Colony, 22 July 1883) was a Protestant Rhenish Missionary active in Namaland, South West Africa.

== Ministry on the Western Cape ==
Hahn was born in 1805 in Teutschenthal in what is today Germany. Hahn trained as a lay brother and farmer with the Rhenish Missionary Institute in Elberfeld-Barmen. In 1834, his order sent him to their mission in Ebenhaeser, in what is today South Africa.

In 1839 Hanh founded the Ebenezer United Reformed Church on the banks of the Olifants river, the site of a Khoikhoi settlement. Hahn built a church, two homes and barns, a windmill, and a water pump, and cultivated lay gardens and fields. He also educated the Khoikhoi on Western agricultural techniques. However, he could not sustain an agrarian lifestyle among the villagers in the drought-stricken region. With his health deteriorating, Hahn left Ebenhaeser.

== In South West Africa ==
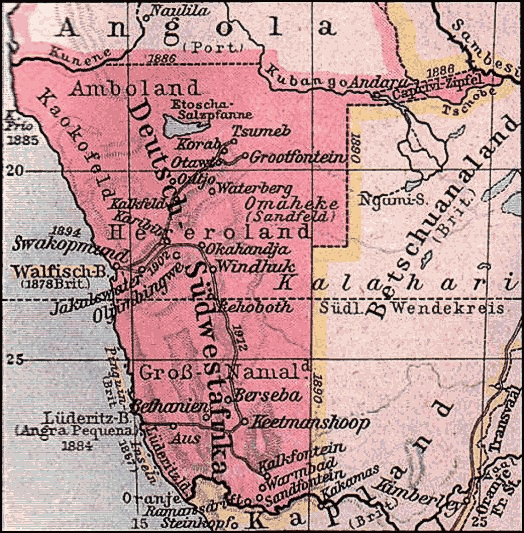
Many towns in central and southern were founded by the Rhenish Missionaries, including Berseba, with the help of Hahn

Because Hahn realized missionary work could only proceed in cohesive communities, he continued trying to convert the nomadic Khoikhoi into farmers. Hahn cultivated fields around Kubis and Oas on the Orange River banks with the help of the San people.

Hahn became the first European to cultivate land at the foot of Brukkaros Mountain, an extinct volcano. At this juncture, the Rhenish Missionaries told Hahn to prioritize missionary work over agriculture.

== Return to Germany and South Africa ==
Accepting his emeritus degree in 1851, Hahn returned with his family to Barmen in Germany in 1852. He worked as an itinerant preacher in Germany until 1875.

Hahn returned to South Africa, remaining there until his death in Stellenbosch in 1883.

== Personal life ==
Hahn married Helene Langenbeck from Barmen, and they had seven children together. His oldest son, Johannes Hahn, was headmaster of the Rhenish Missionary school in Stellenbosch (from whence the Rhenish Girls' High School sprang), and his son Johannes Theophilus Hahn (a merchant, linguist, and librarian. The youngest was Paul Daniel Hahn, chemistry professor at the South African College.

== Sources ==
- (af) De Kock, W.J. 1968. Suid-Afrikaanse Biografiese Woordeboek, vol. I. Pretoria: Nasionale Raad vir Sosiale Navorsing, Departement van Hoër Onderwys.
