= Paul G. Hahnemann =

- Born: October 31, 1912; Strasbourg, France
- Died: January 23, 1997; Munich, Germany
- Other name: "Nischen-Paule"
- Education: Technical University of Karlsruhe
- Occupation: Business executive
- Known for: Director at BMW (1961–1972)

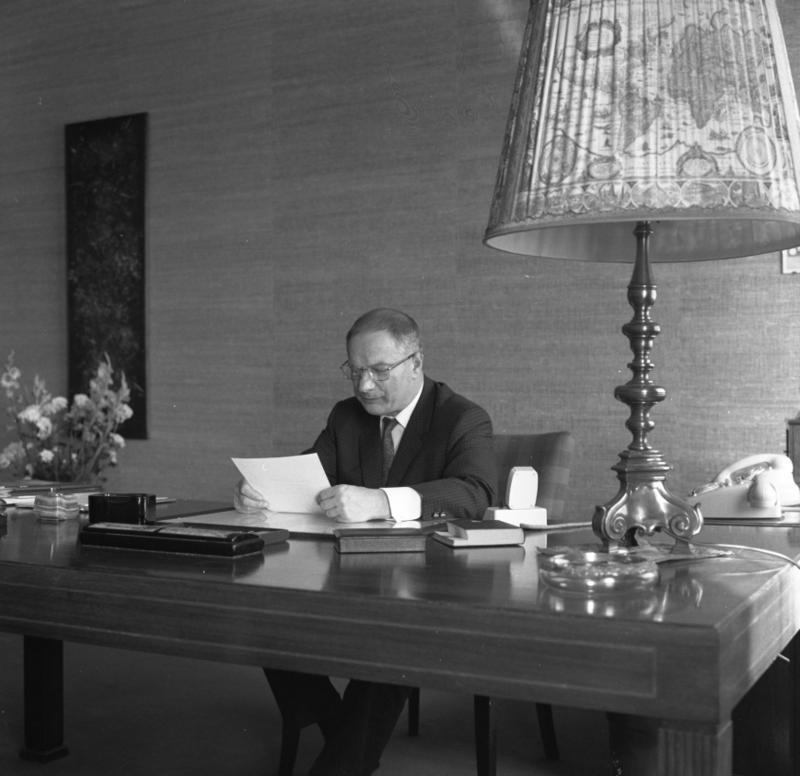
Paul G. Hahnemann in his office at BMW's Munich headquarters, 1968

Paul G. Hahnemann (31 October 1912 in Strasbourg – 23 January 1997 in Munich), sometimes known as "Nischen-Paule", was a German businessman who was a leading director at BMW between 1961 and 1972.

== Early years ==
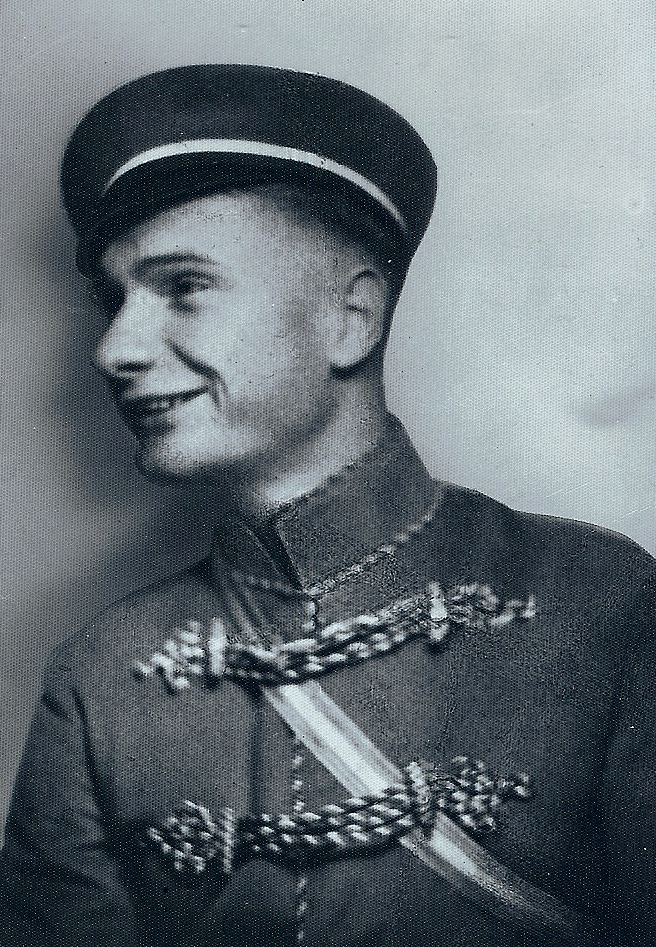
Paul G. Hahnemann as a student: summer 1930

After the end of the First World War (which was followed by the transfer of Strasbourg, where the family had been living, to France), Hahnemann's mother fled with her two sons across the Rhine, to Kehl, now on Germany's western frontier. He successfully completed his Abitur (final exam programme) at the "Kant-Oberrealschule", now the "Kant Gymnsium" (senior school) in Karlsruhe, a short distance to the north.

== BMW years ==
At the end of 1960, Hahnemann was recruited from Auto Union by Herbert Quandt, BMW's largest shareholder, and is believed by some to have had more influence over the business than the Managing Director Karl-Heinz Sonne or his successor Gerhard Wilcke during the 1960s. His tenure failed to survive the arrival of a third managing director in the form of Eberhard von Kuenheim and he left following a difference of opinion over how quickly to increase capacity at the company's newly acquired Dingolfing facility.

Hahnemann oversaw the introduction in 1961 of the BMW 1500. Whether the car created a new 'niche', or merely exploited the niche created by the departure of the Borgward Isabella, its commercial success transformed BMW from a marginal manufacturer with an uncertain future into one of Europe's most consistently profitable auto-makers.
