= South African College =

Former educational institution in Cape Town, South Africa

The South African College was an educational institution in Cape Town, South Africa, which developed into the University of Cape Town (UCT) and the South African College Schools (SACS).

== History ==
The process that would lead to the formation of the South African College was started in 1791, when the Dutch Commissioner-General, Jacob Abraham Uitenhage de Mist, asked for money to be set aside to improve the schools in the Cape. When the British took over the control of the Cape Colony, under the first governor, Lord Charles Henry Somerset, permission was given for the money set aside by de Mist to be used to establish the South African College.

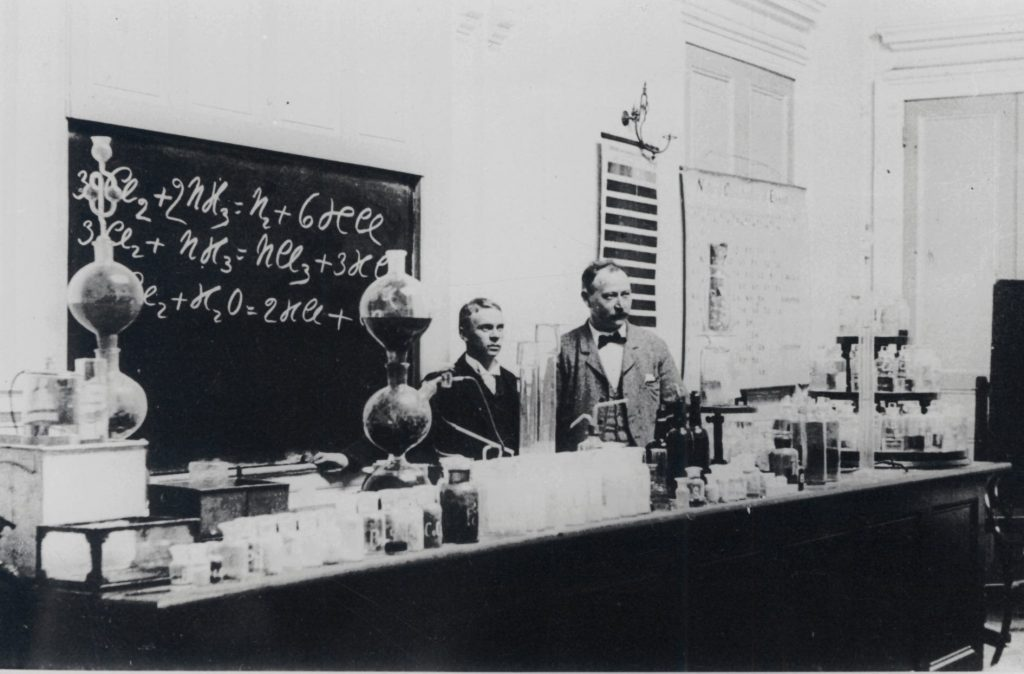
Professor P.D. Hahn (right) conducting a lecture

The founding committee met in the Groote Kerk to discuss funding and accommodation for the school on 1 October 1829. That year, the school opened. Diplomat Edmund Roberts visited the college in 1833. He noted that only wealthy young men attended the school and that classes were offered in both English and Dutch languages. The original location of the school was in the Weeshuis on Long Street and moved to what is now known as the Egyptian Building (on the Hiddingh Campus of UCT) in the Gardens district of Cape Town in 1841.

It was decided in 1874 that the younger students should be separated from their older counterparts. The South African College was separated into the college, which became the University of Cape Town; and the College Schools.
