= Hermann Hahn (architect) =

Hermann Hahn (full name Christian Friedrich Hermann Hahn; 21 March 1841 – 9 February 1929) was a German architect. Hahn lived and worked in Eisenach, where he reached importance, particularly through his plans (designs) of numerous completed villas in Eisenach's south quarter. These mansion districts were established on the hillsides of Mariental valley in the construction boom between 1850 and 1914.

== Life and work ==
Hermann was born on 21 March 1841 in Eisenach. He was the eldest son of Wilhelm Hahn and his wife Maria Dorothea Bonewitz. He began a three-year apprenticeship in masonry, whitewash and stone cutting after completing secondary school in Eisenach. The Hahn family was established in the building industry in Eisenach as master masons, while the Bonewitz family had established themselves as leading fishmongers in Eisenach.

In 1859 Hermann began the traditional journeyman "Wanderschaft" period which took him firstly northwards to Bremen, via Kassel and Hannover; then to Munich where he was employed on the construction of St. Johann Baptist church (Haidhausen)). Later to Austria (Salzburg, and Vienna), Traveling to the Saxon Switzerland (German: Sächsische Schweiz) through Bohemia (Prague, Aussig). Thereafter by ship to Dresden before returning home.

Hahn is listed as an architect on his registration of citizenship in June 1866. His civic works in Eisenach include the designs of the New Synagogue built in 1885, and the church tower of the St. George's Church built between 1899 and 1901.

Hermann also designed or built schools in Eisenach Charlottenschule (now called Goetheschule), the Katherinenschule, and Elisabethenschule (now both Geschwister-Scholl-Schule), as well as schools in nearby villages of Stregda, Mihla, Stedtfeld, Ifta, Dankmarshausen, Kittelsthal.

The castle-like Villa Pflugensberg in Eisenach's cityscape and built for the industrial family von Eichel-Streiber is probably the most famous projects that Hermann Hahn was involved in. As construction manager, he built the mansion in 1890 from the designs of renowned Frankfurt architects Ludwig Neher and Aage von Kauffmann.
