= Janet Hanneman McNulty =

American nurse

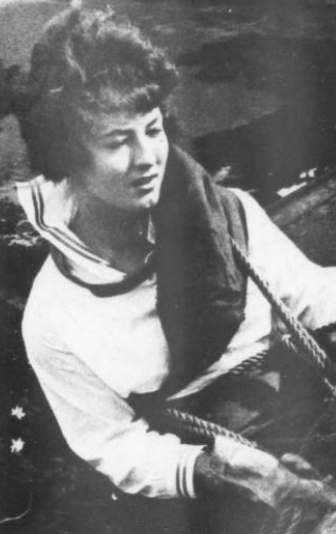
- Hanneman practicing rappelling skills, from a 1962 publication of the Peace Corps
- Born: Janet Fern Hanneman; January 17, 1936; Lincoln County, Kansas, U.S.
- Died: June 9, 2019 (aged 83); Laguna Woods, California, U.S.
- Occupations: Nurse, Peace Corps volunteer

Janet Fern Hanneman McNulty (January 17, 1936 – June 9, 2019) was an American nurse who was a Peace Corps volunteer in Lahore, Pakistan, from 1962 to 1964.

== Early life and education ==
Hanneman was born on a farm in Lincoln County, Kansas, and raised in Junction City, the daughter of Frank William Hanneman and Lydia Ellen Vonada Hanneman. She earned a bachelor's degree in nursing at the University of Kansas in 1958. She pursued further training in psychiatric nursing at Maudsley Hospital in England, and studying psychology on a Rotary Foundation fellowship in New Zealand.

== Career ==
In 1961, Hanneman was one of the first nurses to volunteer for the Peace Corps. She trained in Puerto Rico, studied Urdu, and was assigned to a state-run mental hospital in Lahore, where she worked from 1962 to 1964. One of the patients she worked with at the hospital was American writer Maryam Jameelah. "When I arrived in Pakistan in January 1962, a new hospital administration was taking charge," Hanneman recalled in 1964. "Now each person has a bed and bedding. Food and clothing also have improved. Sections of the hospital once locked are now unlocked." During her service in Lahore she survived three bicycle accidents and a concussion, and contracted malaria and hepatitis.

Hanneman, a photogenic, college-educated nurse from Kansas, became an exemplar of the Peace Corps ideal. She was mentioned in a Sargent Shriver speech about the Peace Corps, appeared in a Peace Corps publicity film, and featured in a Life magazine article in 1965, about the culture shock returning volunteers faced. She was a recruiter for the Peace Corps after her field service ended, and gave interviews and lectures on the Corps' work, including television appearances and international tours.

== Personal life ==
Hanneman married businessman James McNulty in 1965. She died in 2019, at the age of 66, in Laguna Woods, California. Her widower established a nursing scholarship in her memory.
