= C. Hahne Mühlenwerke GmbH & Co. KG =

German cereal manufacturer

- Industry: Food industry
- Founded: 1848

C. Hahne Mühlenwerke GmbH & Co. KG, also known simply as Hahne, is a German producer of cereals founded in 1848 by Carl Dietrich Hahne. The company's headquarters are in Löhne and it currently has over 135 Employees and produces over 250 different cereal products.

== List of product categories ==
- Cornflakes
- Filled cereals
- Cereal flakes
- Crunchy muesli
- Multi-flakes
- Cereal bars
- Muesli
- Sweet cereals
