= Hahn (Holzhausen) =

- Hahn (Holzhausen)
- Location within Germany

Highest point
- Elevation: 255.8 m (839 ft) Normalhöhennull
- Prominence: 47 m (154 ft)Bilstein
- Isolation: 4.25 km (2.64 mi)
- Coordinates: 51°13′01″N 9°25′14″E

Geography
- Location: Schwalm-Eder-Kreis, Hesse, Germany
- Parent range: West Hesse Depression

Geology
- Rock age: Miocene
- Mountain type: neck of an extinct volcano
- Rock type: basalt

The Hahn (German pronunciation: [haːn]) is a 255.8 m (839 ft)-high basalt knoll in the district of Schwalm-Eder-Kreis, within the town of Edermünde-Holzhausen, in Hesse, Germany. Like many other basalt outcrops in the West Hesse Depression, it is the neck of an extinct Miocene volcano, the rest has been eroded. A small medieval tower castle once stood on the hill.

== Location ==
The knoll is located directly north of the town centre of Holzhausen. For this reason the town is often known as Holzhausen am Hahn (engl. Holzhausen on the Hahn). The Pilgerbach stream flows around the southern edge of the Hahn. On the eastern side there is a football field. To the west, the Autobahn A49 passes by.

== History of the Tower ==
Count Werner IV von Grüningen (1060-1121), who founded the Benedictine Monastery of Breitenau near Guxhagen in 1113, built a tower castle around 1100 on the Hahn. The castle is first mentioned in documents in 1111. It probably consisted of a tower castle on top of the hill, with further fortification on the lower plateau. The buildings were probably destroyed before 1294 and fell down after 1346. The ruins of the castle were still mentioned in the 16th Century, and at the beginning of the 19th Century, when material was removed for paths and roads, masonry stones and mortar, as well as human remains were found. All traces of the castle have now been removed.

== Culture ==
In the 1980s, a rock- and pop-festival was organised in Holzhausen called 'Rock-am-Hahn'. It featured rock bands such as the 'Rodgau Monotones', Opus, Wolfgang Ambros and Klaus Lage. This festival was revived in 2006 by the local youth organisations. Its primary objective is to promote up-and-coming bands.

== Other Facts ==
On the hill there are ca. two hectares of forest, the basalt cliffs and the south-eastern flank are not forested. The plateau is designated a protected nature area. In 1999 and 2000 the citizens of Holzhausen remediated the path to the top of the hill. From here a good view of Holzhausen and the surrounding area can be seen.
