= Rethink Robotics =

Robotics company headquartered in Germany

Rethink Robotics GmbH
- Formerly: Heartland Robotics, Inc.
- Industry: Robotics
- Founded: 2008; Relaunched 2024
- Founders: Rodney Brooks, Ann Whittaker
- Defunct: 2018 originally 2025 from the 2024 relaunch
- Headquarters: Initially: Boston, United States of America; Later: Bochum, Germany
- Products: Reacher, Ryder, Riser
- Owner: United Robotics Group GmbH
- Number of employees: 10 (at dissolution)
- Website: rethinkrobotics.com (Now links to a dead landing page)

Rethink Robotics (formerly Heartland Robotics, Inc.) was a robotics company co-founded by Rodney Brooks and Ann Whittaker in 2008. In 2018 the assets of Rethink Robotics were bought by the German automation specialist HAHN Group. In 2021 Rethink Robotics joined the United Robotics Group GmbH.

Rethink Robotics has won awards and has been an Edison Awards finalist.

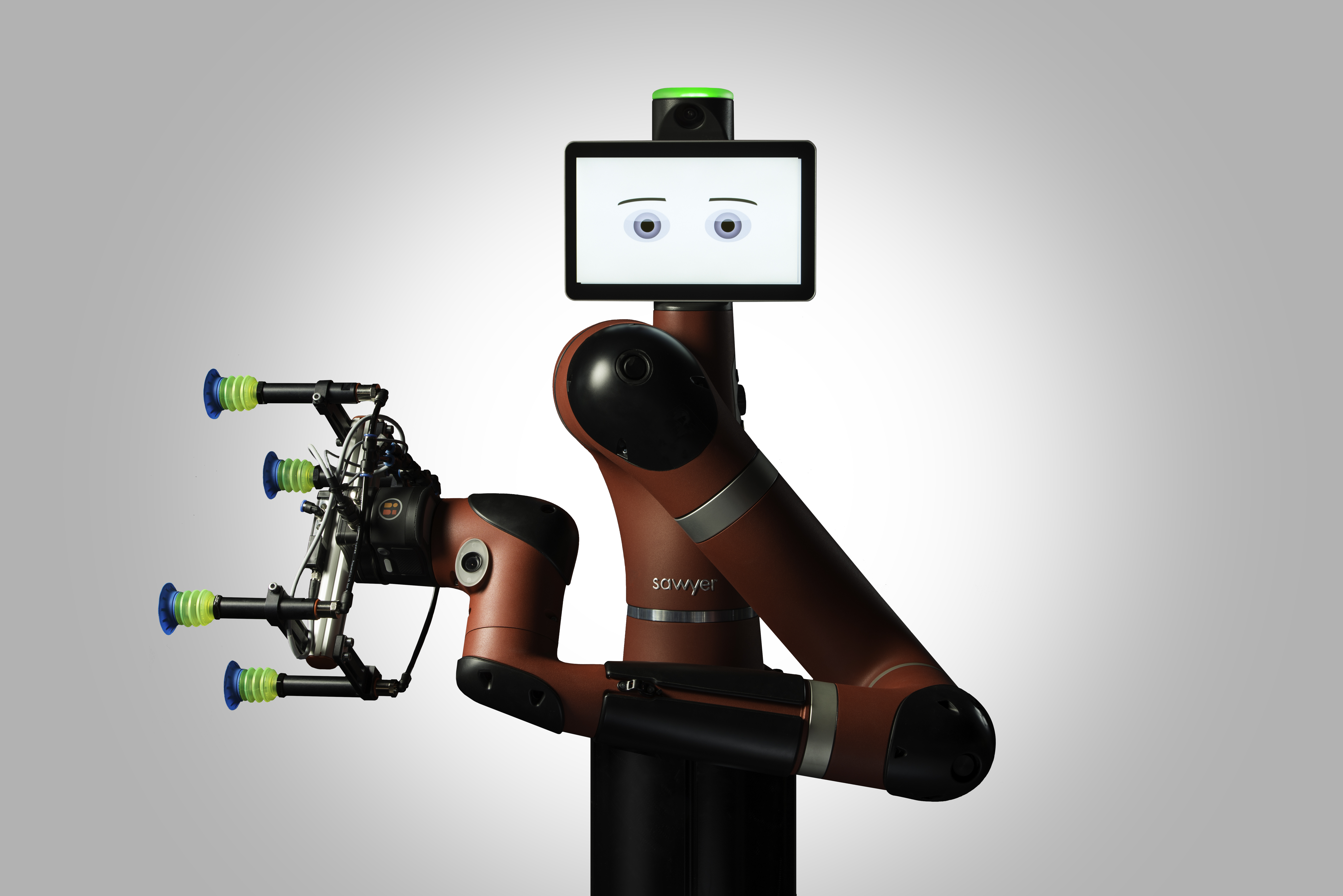
Sawyer, the collaborative robot

== History ==
Heartland Robotics was founded in 2008 as a startup aiming to create low-cost robots. In 2012, they released the robot Baxter. In 2015, they released a smaller and more flexible counterpart to Baxter, Sawyer, that was designed to perform smaller, more detailed tasks.

In 2016, they changed their name to Rethink Robotics and released their collaborative cobots worldwide. These robots were designed to be easy to set up and work alongside, rather than replace, humans in factory environments.

In October 2018, Rethink Robotics ceased operations and sold off its assets. Other companies picked up support for the robots.

- Most of the Rethink Robotics assets were bought by a distributor, the HAHN Group, a German automation specialist. HAHN Group acquired all of Rethink's patents and trademarks as well as Rethink's Intera 5 software platform.
- About 100 Baxter robots and the rights to sell them in North America were bought by Hunan CoThink Robotics Technology Company.

In October 2019, Rethink Robotics launched the new Sawyer BLACK Edition. The headquarters of Rethink Robotics moved from Rheinböllen to Bochum in mid 2020, and signed a partnership with Siemens.

In August 2024 Rethink Robotics GmbH was shut down due to operational reasons.

In September 2024 Rethink Robotics, Inc. reappeared with new products. However, this relaunch failed, and shut down the following year.
