= Stephen Hahn (art dealer) =

American art dealer

Stephen Hahn (February 1, 1921 – April 2, 2011) was an American art dealer and collector. An expert on Picasso, Degas, and others, he held one of the most significant collections of twentieth century masters during his years operating the Stephen Hahn Gallery in New York City.

== Early life ==
Born in Hungary, Hahn moved to Paris at the age of twelve. His father was an art dealer who specialized in the Old Masters. During World War II, Stephen lived in Santo Domingo, spending 6 years there and working as a surveyor. After the war, he returned to Paris, where he attended the École du Louvre, and studied and taught at the Sorbonne. In 1952, he moved to New York City with his wife, Nancy, an American.

== Career ==
Hahn began his career as a New York art dealer buying and selling paintings from the trunk of his car. An early champion of Jean Dubuffet, he eventually opened the Stephen Hahn Gallery at 75th Street and Madison Avenue.

A founding member of the Art Dealers Association of America, he donated art to cultural institutions worldwide. His personal collection featured pieces by such modern masters as Picasso, Cezanne, and Matisse.

== Philanthropy ==
Hahn was a benefactor of the Music Academy of the West in Montecito near Santa Barbara, CA, with Hahn Hall being named after him.

== Art theft ==
In 1969, seven paintings were stolen from the Hahn gallery. Valued at $500,000 in total, the works included pieces by Monet and Pissarro. Ironically, while the theft was occurring, Hahn was discussing the subject of art theft with the Art Dealers Association of America.

== Nazi looted art ==
Two paintings embroiled in Nazi-era restitution cases involved the Stephen Hahn gallery. The Camille Pissarro painting, "Rue St. Honoré, après midi, effet de pluie" which is disputed in the Cassirer v Thyssen case, was purchased in October 1976 by Baron Hans Heinrich Thyssen-Bornemisza from the Stephen Hahn Gallery after passing through the dealers Frank Perls and Knoedler. In another case, Picasso's “Femme en Blanc” (Woman in White) was purchased by Marilynn Alsdorf and her late husband, James from Stephen Hahn. When the painting turned out to be Nazi-looted art that had belonged to the Bennigson family, the Bennigsons sued the Alsdorfs for the restitution of the painting and the Alsdorfs sued Hahn for having sold them looted art.
