= Hahn Automation Group =

Group of companies that specialize in industrial automation and robotics

Hahn Automation Group Holding GmbH
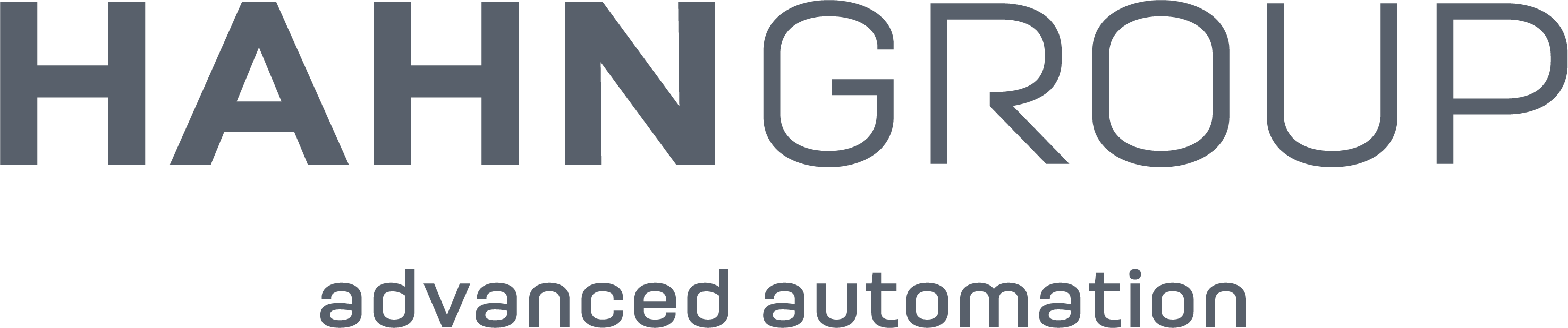
- Founded: November 29, 2016
- Headquarters: Rheinböllen, Germany Frankfurt am Main
- Key people: Philipp Unterhalt, CEO; Axel Greschitz, CFO
- Number of employees: about 1,600
- Website: https://www.hahn.group/

The Hahn Automation Group Holding GmbH is a corporate group specializing in industrial automation technology and robotics. The headquarters are located in Rheinböllen, Germany and Frankfurt am Main.

== History ==
Thomas Hähn founded the company Hähn Engineering in 1992 with three employees. After the company was renamed to Hahn Automation, the first foreign location in the United States (USA) was established in 2000.

In 2014, RAG-Stiftung Beteiligungsgesellschaft acquired a majority stake in Hahn Automation. As a result of this investment, the Hahn Group was founded as a holding company. In 2016, Hahn Holding GmbH was established. At that time, Hahn Automation, Wemo Automation, Hahn Robotics, and Waldorf Technik were part of the company. In 2017, a renaming to Hahn Group took place. Invotec was incorporated into the Hahn Group in 2017. GeKu Automatisierungssysteme, Kitov Systems, and Hahn Automation UK were added to the company in 2018. In 2019, the companies DFT Maschinenbau, Walther Systemtechnik, and REI Automation joined the Hahn Group.

Philipp Unterhalt developed the concept of the Hahn Group as a federation of medium-sized automation and robotics specialists in collaboration with founder Thomas Hähn.

In 2023, the renaming to Hahn Automation Group Holding occurred.

== Integrated Companies and Brands ==
=== HAHN Automation ===
Hahn Automation Group (formerly Hahn Automation) is a manufacturer of special machines and specializes in the automation of assembly and testing processes for rubber, plastic, and metal parts. Currently, about 900 employees work at locations in Germany, China, the United Kingdom, Croatia, Mexico, the Czech Republic, and the USA. The headquarters of the Hahn Automation Group is located in Rheinböllen, Rhineland-Palatinate.

=== Hahn Automation Group Engen ===
Hahn Automation Group Engen (formerly Waldorf Technik) specializes in automation in the injection molding sector and operates in the medical technology, packaging technology, and barrier technology industries. It is headquartered in Engen and employs around 100 employees.

=== Hahn Automation Group US, Inc. ===
Hahn Automation Group US, Inc. (formerly Invotec) develops and produces automation solutions for assembly, testing, and inspection processes for medical device manufacturers. The company is located not only at its headquarters in Dayton, Ohio but also has a presence in Minneapolis, Minnesota.

=== Hahn Automation Group Diepenau ===
Hahn Automation Group Diepenau (formerly GeKu Automatisierungssysteme) specializes in automation for plastic, rubber, and metal processing companies. Its product portfolio includes system robots, handling technology, conveyor and packaging systems, and quality assurance systems.

=== Kitov Systems ===
Kitov Systems is a manufacturer of intelligent visual inspection systems, focusing primarily on high-end electronics manufacturing in the automotive, medical technology, defense, and aerospace industries. The company is located in Petach Tikwa, Israel.

=== Hahn Automation Group Austria ===
Hahn Automation Group Austria (formerly DFT Maschinenbau) specializes in automated assembly and testing technology and produces for the automotive industry, including pumps, brake systems, exhaust gas treatment systems, transmissions, turbochargers, automotive electronics, and safety boxes. Based in Kremsmünster, Austria, the company employs around 100 employees.

=== Walther Systemtechnik ===
Walther Systemtechnik develops and builds systems for dosing applications for the automotive, pharmaceutical, food, rubber, chemical, and metal processing industries and has its branch in Germersheim.

=== REI Automation ===
REI Automation specializes in the development and construction of custom industrial systems such as assembly lines, robot cells, and special machine systems in the medical, nuclear, consumer goods, electronics, and automotive industries. The company's headquarters is located in Columbia, South Carolina.

Orwin Ltd. and Multi Automation Ltd. based in the United Kingdom were acquired in 2018 and merged into Hahn Automation Ltd. The activities of both locations focus on the manufacturing of equipment for special machine construction.
