= Schell Leather Company =

American manufacturer of leather and synthetic carrying cases

- 1958 Company logo
- Company type: Private
- Industry: Leather goods, luggage, synthetic materials
- Founded: 1870; 155 years ago in Cincinnati, Ohio
- Founder: Albert Schell, Charles J. Schell
- Headquarters: St. Petersburg, Florida, United States
- Area served: United States
- Key people: Charles J. Schell, Stephen Hahn
- Products: Leather goods; Vinyl, plastic, and synthetic cases; Briefcases; Medical bags (Emdee); Tool and travel bags

The Schell Leather Company (also known as Schell Leather Goods, Schell Leather Goods Company, or Schell Inc.) is an American manufacturer of carrying cases and bags made from leather, vinyl, plastic, nylon, and other synthetic materials. Originally based in Cincinnati, Ohio, the company was active for more than a century and later relocated to St. Petersburg, Florida.

== History ==
The company was founded by Albert and Charles J. Schell, though sources differ on the year of establishment. One 1985 article gives the founding year as either 1865 or 1870, while other records suggest operations began in 1901 or even as late as 1925. The company remained active until at least 1985.

By 1929, Schell's factory was located at 1015 Race Street in Cincinnati. It later moved to a two-story 100 ft × 100 ft (30 m × 30 m) facility at 2965 Central Parkway. Construction on the building began around 1931 by Parkway Construction Co. at a cost of approximately US$70,000 (equivalent to $1,447,330 in 2024), although some sources indicate the move occurred closer to 1938. Schell operated from that address until at least 1959, then relocated between 1959 and 1962 to 242 West McMicken Avenue, where it remained in operation through at least 1967. In 1980, the company moved its headquarters and manufacturing operations to St. Petersburg, Florida.

Charles Schell was involved with the business for approximately 35 years, serving as general manager, operator, and leather buyer. In 1968, Stephen Hahn acquired the company from the Schell family and became its president. Under Hahn's leadership, Schell purchased a Chicago-based plastic-case manufacturer and relocated production to Florida. During this period, the company’s annual revenue grew to about $6.5 million (equivalent to $19 million in 2024). The company also owned Action Leathercraft, Inc. in Commerce, California, and operated subsidiaries such as Allstate Custom Cases and Lords Business Cases.
