= Paul Daniel Hahn =

South African educational chemical analyst

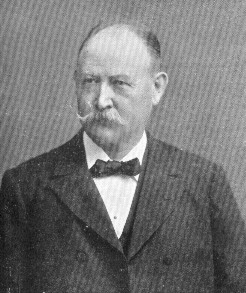
- c. 1910
- Born: 5 January 1849; Bethanien, German South West Africa
- Died: 9 March 1918 (aged 69); Cape Town
- Spouse: Marie Aneck van Gotha
- Children: six children
- Relatives: Johannes Samuel Hahn (brother)

Academic background
- Education: University of Halle

Academic work
- Discipline: Chemists
- Institutions: University of Cape Town

Paul Daniel Hahn (5 January 1849 – 9 March 1918) was a South African educational chemical analyst and professor of chemistry. He is considered a pioneer in the education of natural sciences in South Africa.

== Early life and education ==
Hahn was born 5 January 1849 in Bethanien, German South West Africa and was the youngest son of Johannes Samuel Hahn, a missionary with the Rhenish Missionary Society, and his wife, Helene Langenbeck. When he was about four years old, the family returned to Germany, where he attended the gymnasium in Soest, Westphalia. He then attended the University of Halle where he received his Master of Arts and Ph.D. in 1874. He also studied at the universities of London and Edinburgh.

== Academic career ==
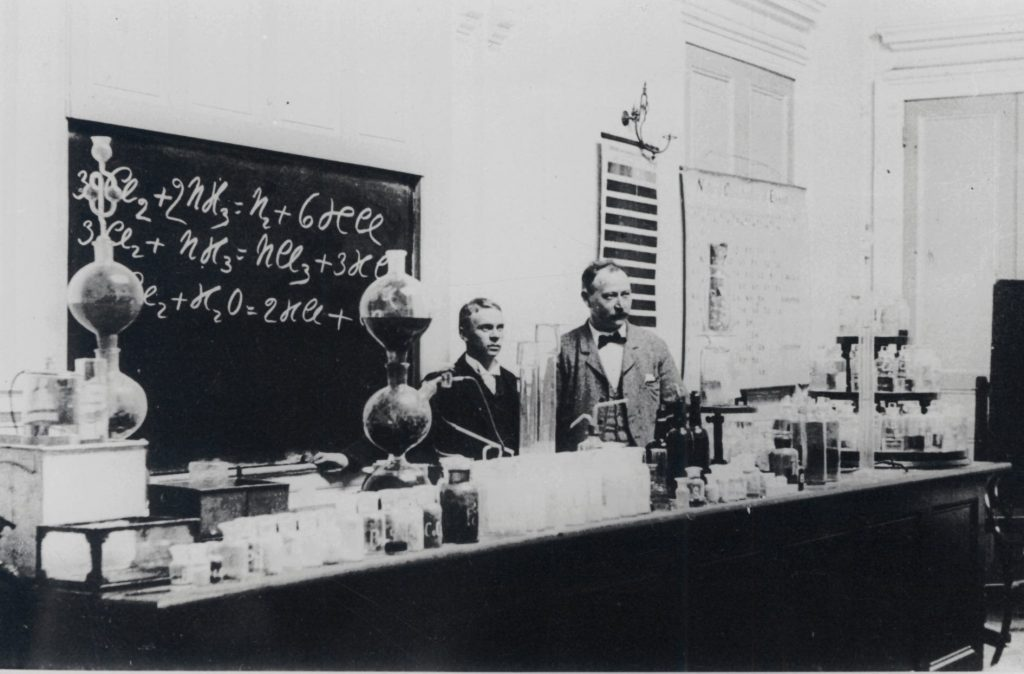
Professor P.D. Hahn (right) conducting a lecture

Hahn returned to South Africa in September 1875. In January 1876 he was appointed the Jamison Professor in Experimental Physics and Practical Chemistry at the South African College, Cape Town. In 1893 he also became the Professor of Chemistry. He held this chair until his death and, together with Professors C.E. Lewis and W. Ritchie, formed a triumvirate that controlled the college until the end of the nineteenth century.

In 1876 he was elected to the council of the University of the Cape of Good Hope, of which the SA College (forerunner of the University of Cape Town and from which SACS also arose) is a constituent college, and remained a member for the rest of his life member.

== Contribution to higher education ==
On assuming his post, Hahn immediately began campaigning for better facilities. In 1881 a new chemistry laboratory was built after a £1,500 donation from Mrs S.B.E. Jamison. Under his watch the natural sciences became an important part of the curriculum. Mrs Jamison also donated the £5,000 for the establishment of the Jamison Chair. Hahn prevented the state's efforts to introduce regular visits to the college by school inspectors. Hahn was also instrumental in persuading the college authorities to agree in 1887 that women could be admitted to all classes. Prior to this, Hahn had already admitted four women to his chemistry class as a trial trun the preceding year. Thanks to the exceptionally high standard of the women's work, the college decided to admit women students full-time in 1887 in honor of Queen Victoria's Diamond Jubilee.

Hahn also played a leading role in the establishment of a mining school at the college, which later merged with the Johannesburg School of Mines. In 1894, Hahn and Professor Lewis undertook a successful tour of the Transvaal and Kimberley in order to raise money for a new physics laboratory. He was also active in the movement that led to the establishment of a medical school at the college in 1911. In 1900 Hahn and Professor J.C. Beattie (later Sir Carruthers Beattie) were recognised as non-academic lecturers by the Scottish universities.

He was voted secretary of the college senate several times, and in 1897 he and Lewis became the first two senate assessors in the collegiate council. He played an important role in the college's struggle for university status, which resulted in it becoming the University of Cape Town on 2 April 1918, a year before his death.

The chemistry building at University of Cape Town was named in his honour, PD Hahn. In 2011, a display was curated at the south-side entrance of the building to commemorate his life, the history of the building and his role in accepting women on campus.

== Other contributions ==
Together with Jan Hendrik Hofmeyr (Onze Jan), Hahn was involved in the Cape government's purchase of Groot Constantia in 1882 as a model wine farm. He served on two government commissions that studied the phylloxera disease in the Cape vineyards.

He also campaigned for the development of the state forestry school and the introduction of agricultural education at Victoria College, currently Stellenbosch University. For years he was the only chemical analyst and consulting chemist in South Africa. He encouraged development of the government laboratories in Cape Town and his advice was sought on a wide variety of scientific and scientific-legal problems.

At the turn of the century, the German government, in recognition of his long and dedicated service to the cause of science and education, awarded him the traditional title of Königlicher Hofrat, which usually comes after 25 years of professorial service. He was a member of the Royal Society of South Africa, a founder of and twice chairman of the Cape Chemical Society, chairman of the South African Society for the Advancement of Science (1911), and also a member of numerous other scientific associations.

Although Hahn did not like to write, he did publish a number of pamphlets and articles, mainly on viticulture and mineralogy.

== Personal life ==
On 28 June 1875, Hahn married Marie Aneck van Gotha and they had six children: three sons and three daughters.

He died 9 March 1918 in Cape Town.
