= Interactive C =

- The Interactive C Logo
- Developer(s): KISS Institute for Practical Robotics
- Initial release: 1997, 27–28 years ago
- Stable release: 8.0.2 (March 31, 2008) [±]
- Preview release: Non [±]
- Operating system: Windows, macOS, Linux, IRIX, Solaris, SunOS
- Available in: English
- License: Distributed without charge by KISS Institute for Practical Robotics, a 501(c)3 nonprofit organization
- Website: www.newtonlabs.com/ic

Interactive C
- Stable release: 8.0.2 (March 31, 2008) [±]
- Preview release: Non [±]
- Website: www.botball.org/ic/,%20http://www.newtonlabs.com/ic/

Influenced by
- C

Interactive C is a program which uses a modified version of ANSI C with several libraries and features that allow hobbyists to program small robotics platforms.

== Version by Newton Research Labs ==
Newton Research Labs developed Interactive C as a compiling environment for robots using the Motorola 6811 processor. The MIT LEGO Robot Design Contest (6.270) was the original purpose for the software. It became popular, however, due to its ability to compile on the fly rather than taking time to compile beforehand as other languages had done. The programming environment's newest version is IC Version 8.0.2, which supports these operating systems:

- Microsoft Windows XP, 2000, Vista
- Macintosh
- Unix and Unix-like: IRIX, Solaris, SunOS; Linux

The screenshot to the right shows Interactive C running on a Windows operating system. The program features an Interaction Window where one-line C commands can be sent to the connected controller as well as an editing window, here titled main.c, where a program file is being edited and can be sent to the attached controller.

Here is the basic "Hello World" example for IC programming:

void main()
 {
      printf("Hello World");
 }

Here is another example using motor ports 1 and 3:

void main()
 {
      motor(1,100);
      motor(3,100);
      sleep(2.0);
      ao();
 }

A basic infinite loop that will beep for ever:

void main()
{
    while(1)
    {
        beep();
    }
}

Interactive C is used by Ohio State University to program MIT Handy Boards in its Fundamentals of Engineering for Honors Program.

== Version by KISS Institute for Practical Robotics ==
KISS Institute for Practical Robotics developed a third-party alternative to the Newton Labs version of Interactive C for their Botball Educational Robotics Program.

The latest version of Interactive C by KISS Institute for Practical Robotics is IC 8.0.2, which supports these operating systems:

- Windows 2000, XP, Vista
- Mac OS X 10.3, 10.4, 10.5
- Linux (with gcc 3.3)

IC8 supports the following robotics controllers:

- Xport Botball Controller (XBC) versions 1, 2, and 3
- Xport Botball Controller (XBC) with iRobot Create
- MIT Handy Board with Expansion Board
- Lego RCX using the serial IR tower
