= Ryan Gariepy =

Canadian roboticist

- Born: October 25, 1986 (age 40); Barrie, Ontario
- Education: University of Waterloo (BSc, MSc)
- Occupations: co-founder and chief technology officer of Clearpath Robotics
- Relatives: Ray Gariepy, grandfather

Ryan Gariepy (born October 25, 1986) is a Canadian engineer, roboticist, and technology entrepreneur. He co-founded Clearpath Robotics with Matt Rendall, Bryan Webb, and Patrick Martinson in 2009, and subsidiary OTTO Motors in 2015. Gariepy currently serves as the Vice President of Robotics of Rockwell Automation, the Chair of the Canadian Robotics Council, and as a founding board member of Open Robotics. Ryan is widely recognized as a leader in autonomous mobile robotics and is named on more than 80 patents and patents pending related to intelligent and autonomous systems.

In 2023, Clearpath Robotics and its industrial division OTTO Motors were acquired by Rockwell Automation in a deal reported to be valued at up to US$600 million, marking one of the largest robotics exits in the world, and the largest in Canadian history. Following the acquisition, the companies continued operating under Rockwell Automation's Intelligent Devices division.

== Early life ==
Ryan Gariepy was born in Barrie, Ontario, on October 25, 1986. He was valedictorian of the St. Peter's Catholic Secondary School class of 2004, where he received seven awards. He later entered the University of Waterloo, where he obtained a Bachelor of Applied Science degree in Mechatronics Engineering in 2009, and a Master of Science degree in Mechanical Engineering in 2012.

== Career ==
Ryan's early career included internships at Kiva Systems in 2007 (now Amazon Robotics), and Aeryon Labs (now Teledyne FLIR), where he designed one of the first touchscreen interfaces for commercial drone control.

Gariepy co-founded Clearpath Robotics, also in Waterloo, Ontario, Canada, in 2009. The company initially focused on developing unmanned ground vehicles and robotics platforms for research institutions and industrial customers. Over time, it expanded into autonomous mobile robots (AMRs) used in manufacturing, logistics, mining, agriculture, and aerospace sectors.

Under Gariepy’s technical leadership, Clearpath Robotics built one of the largest mobile robotics development teams in Canada and deployed thousands of robots globally for research and industrial automation.

In 2015, Gariepy helped launch OTTO Motors, a division focused on self-driving industrial vehicles designed to automate material transport inside factories and warehouses. The OTTO product line became widely adopted in manufacturing and logistics environments and helped accelerate the adoption of autonomous mobile robots in industrial automation.

In September 2023, Clearpath Robotics and OTTO Motors were acquired by Rockwell Automation. Following the acquisition, both companies continued operating within Rockwell’s Intelligent Devices segment while maintaining their brands and development operations in Waterloo Region.

Gariepy became a founding member of the board of directors of Open Robotics in 2012 and has helped support the development of open-source robotics software such as the Robot Operating System (ROS). He has also served as a co-organizer for the ROS Developer Conference since 2012.

Gariepy was a founding member of the board of directors of Next Generation Manufacturing Canada, a founding member of the board of directors of the NSERC Canadian Robotics Network, and an IEEE Robotics and Automation Society keynote speaker. He was the sole Singularity University Canada Robotics Faculty Member, and was also an associate with Creative Destruction Lab's Space program.

Ryan is also co-founder and co-chair of the Canadian Robotics Council, a national industry organization created to promote robotics innovation, commercialization and policy development across Canada. Through the Canadian Robotics Council, Gariepy has helped advocate for the growth of Canada’s robotics ecosystem, including international collaboration initiatives and national robotics policy discussions.

== Awards & Recognition ==
In 2015, Gariepy was recognized by the University of Waterloo with the Faculty of Engineering Alumni Achievement Medal alongside the other Clearpath Robotics co-founders.

Gariepy is often credited as the first roboticist and first entrepreneur to openly pledge not to make 'killer robot' (Lethal autonomous weapon) systems.

In 2023, Gariepy won the Canadian Image Processing and Pattern Recognition Society Lifetime Achievement Award.

Gariepy also received the IERA Award in 2025 in the Entrepreneurship & Tech category for developing OTTO, a pioneering autonomous mobile robot system capable of moving heavy loads through factories and operating in large fleets of more than 100 robots.

In 2026, Gariepy was named one of the winners of the HardTech Awards from MistyWest, a Vancouver-based engineering design consultancy. The award recognized his contributions to robotics and autonomous systems, including deploying robots in hundreds of research institutions worldwide and helping establish Canada as a leader in robotics innovation.
