= Robot App Store =

Application distribution platform

RobotAppStore
- Release: August 28, 2011; 15 years ago
- Operating system: All robotics operating systems
- Type: Software update, digital distribution
- License: Proprietary
- Website: www.robotappstore.com

The Robot App Store is a digital application distribution platform for applications for robots opened to the public on late 2011. The service allows users to browse and download applications that were developed for robots, and published through the RobotAppStore.com website.

Depending on the developer, applications are available either for free or at a cost. The applications can be downloaded directly to a robot, (like Nao) or downloaded onto a personal computer (PC) or a smartphone. 70% of the sale price goes to the developer of the app.

== History ==
The Robot App Store opened on Aug. 28, 2011. for developers. In early 2012, the website was opened for consumers.

The Robot App Store is available for developers and robot-owners from around the world.

The portal offers a centralized encyclopedia for robotics topics called Robopedia. A comprehensive knowledge-base for developers covering development lessons for popular robotics platforms such as Roomba, Parrot AR.Drone, Lego Mindstorms NXT and even robotics operating systems such as Robot Operating System (ROS).

== Supported platforms ==
The Robot App Store supports all commercially available robots, and all operating systems available for robots. A typical application will run autonomously on the robot’s processor and internal resources. However, applications can be executed on platforms such as a laptops, desktops and smartphones.

A list of supported robots, and supported application formats:

Robot Name	Supported apps formats
Robotis Bioloid	C++
Violet KAROTZ	JavaScript, XML
Sony AIBO	RCODE
Lego Mindstorms NXT	Mindstorms Software, C++, .NET, Robot Operating System (ROS)
iRobot Roomba	C++, .NET, ROS, Java, Android
iRobot Create	C++, .NET, ROS, Java, Android
Aldebaran Robotics Nao	Choregraphe, C++, .NET, ROS
Parrot AR.Drone	C++, .NET, ROS, Java, Android
Orbotix Sphero	Java, Android
TheCorpora Q.bo	ROS
WowWee RS Media	WowWee Personality, C++
WowWee Rovio	C++, .NET, Blackberry COD and JAD
Innvo Labs Pleo	Pleo Skit

== Developer program ==
Individuals and companies can join the developer's program and submit their applications for approval and distribution. Once joined, identity verification is required to confirm the ownership of the account. Approved developers are getting access to pre-launched apps.

== Robopedia ==
On August 17, 2012, the company launched Robopedia, the first encyclopedia covering robotics topics. The resource was driven by customer service requests for more information about apps that people had downloaded for their home robot projects. RobotAppStore.com's founder, Elad Inbar, said that more than 70 percent of their calls from customers were for more information. The topics cover the present and future of robots, including their components and concepts. It enables beginners and seasoned developers to learn about robotics acronyms and terminology, and read step-by-step application-development for many robots, vacuum cleaners and humanoids alike.

== Funding ==
The company was funded by its founders since its inception. On December 10, 2012, the company announced its first external investment of $250,000 from Grishin Robotics, which was founded by Dmitry Grishin, the CEO and Chairman of Mail.ru Group. The company is the second company funded by Grishin Robotics following the investment into Double Robotics earlier in 2012.
