= Robotis Bioloid =

Educational robotics kit

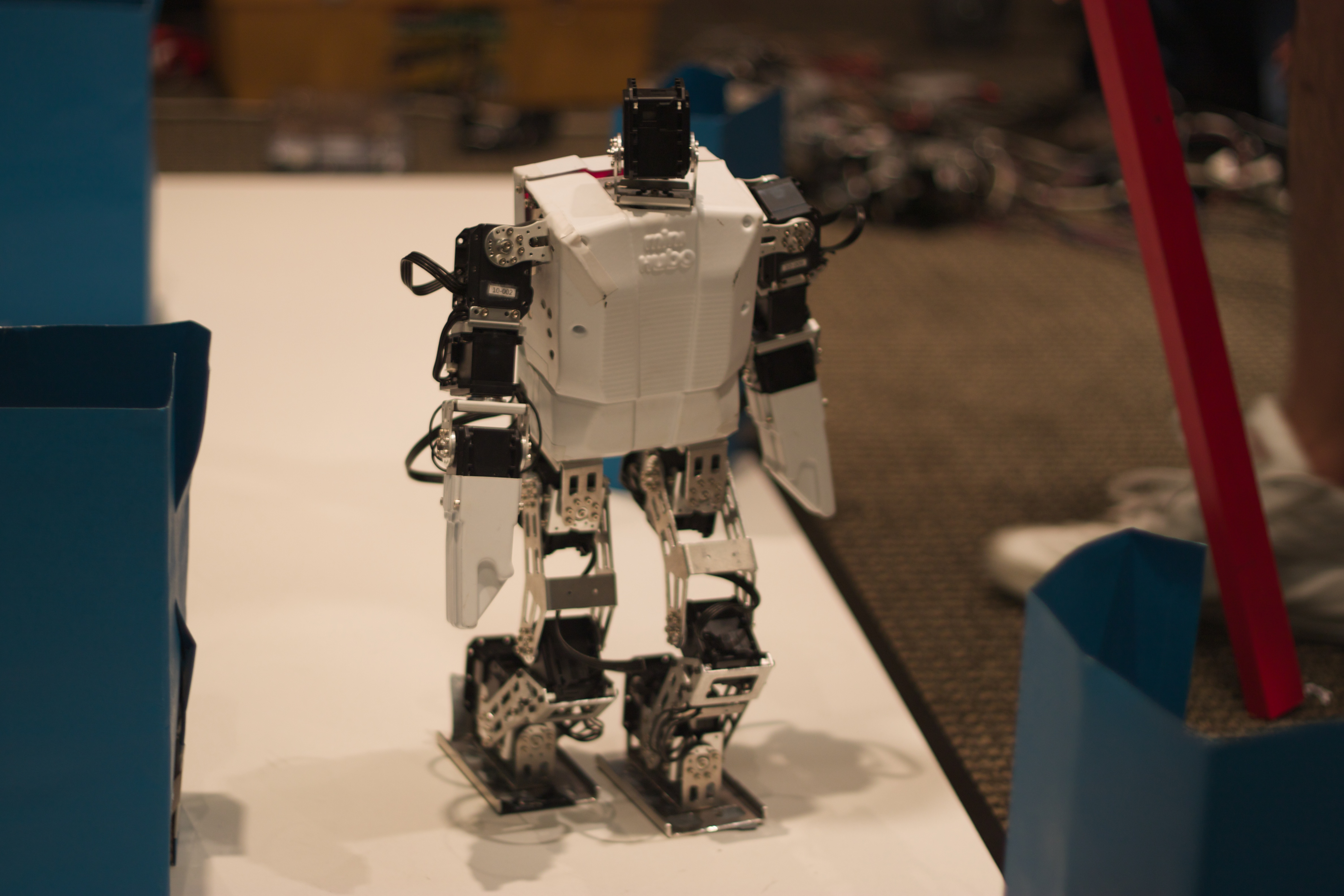
Humanoid robot constructed using the Bioloid kit

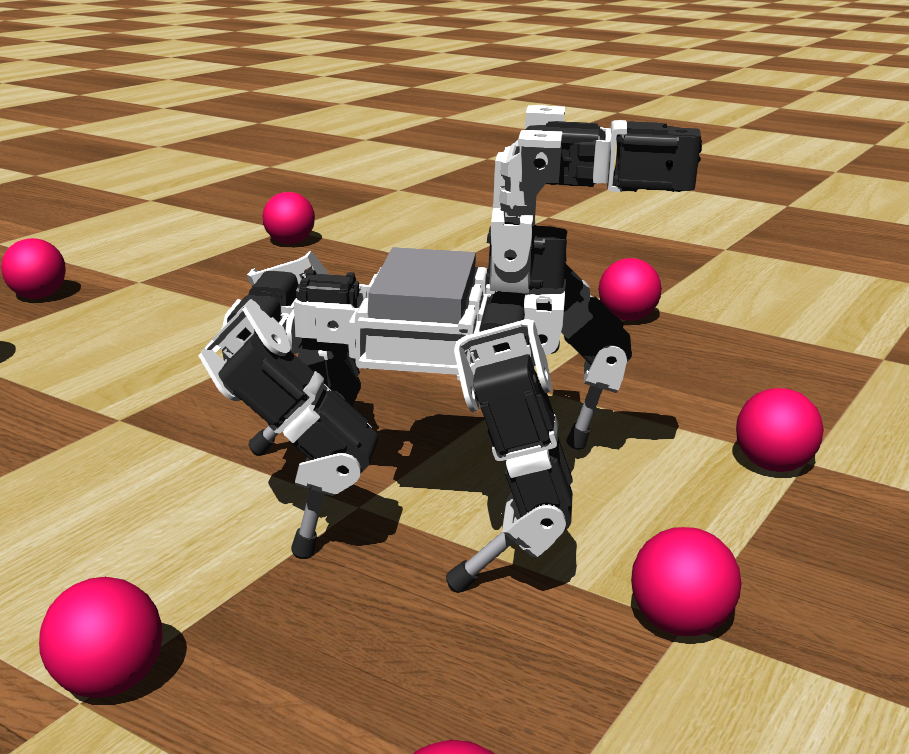
Dog modelled in Webots using the Bioloid Kit

The Robotis Bioloid (stylized as ROBOTIS BIOLOID) is a hobbyist and educational robot kit produced by the South Korean robot manufacturer Robotis. The Bioloid platform consists of components and small, modular servomechanisms called the AX-12A Dynamixels, which can be used in a daisy-chained fashion to construct robots of various configurations, such as wheeled, legged, or humanoid robots. The Robot is programmed with RoboPlus, C (programming language) based software. The Bioloid system is thus comparable to the Lego Mindstorms, and VEX Robotics VEXplorer kits.

== Kit types ==
There are multiple variations of the Bioloid kit:

- Robotis Bioloid Beginner – includes parts and designs for 14 robot types; discontinued
- Robotis Bioloid Comprehensive – includes parts and designs for 26 robot types; discontinued
- Robotis Bioloid Expert – designed for education or research use; discontinued
- Robotis Bioloid Premium – upgraded and latest version of Bioloid Comprehensive Kit builds 29 different configurations
- Robotis Bioloid GP – intended for robot competitions
- Robotis Darwin-Mini Humanoid Robot – 3d printed shell allows infinite customization options
- Robotis Bioloid STEM Standard – includes parts and designs for 7 robot types
- Robotis Bioloid STEM Expansion – includes parts and designs for 9 robot types; requires purchase of STEM Standard

== TurtleBot 3 and other platforms ==
Turtlebot 3, announced in 2016 and developed in collaboration with Robotis and the Open Source Robotics Foundation, is the smallest and cheapest of the TurtleBots.

Other Robotis platforms include: Robotis OP 2, Robotis Manipulator, and ThorMang3.

== TB3 plug-ins for Gazebo ==
Robotis has TurtleBot3 plug-ins for the Gazebo robotics simulator that allow simulating a TB3 Burger, Waffle, or Waffle Pi.

== Applications ==
The platform is currently in use by the U.S. Naval Academy in their mechanical engineering courses, and is also popular in the RoboCup international robotics competition and FIRA competition.

Year	Country	Application	Work by
2007	UK	Bioloid based Humanoid Soccer Robot Design	Joerg Wolf, University of Plymouth
2014	Iran	Bioloid used to teach children how to pray	Akbar Rezaie, schoolteacher
2014	USA	Extra Pair of Fingers	MIT
2016	Unknown	Bioloid/Dynamixel planar biped robot, MATLAB control - simple movements	deDasil

== See also ==
- TurtleBot
- DARwIn-OP now known as Robotis OP2
