= IRobot Create =

Hobbyist robot based on the Roomba vacuum cleaner

iRobot Create
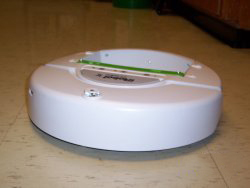
- an unmodified iRobot Create with Command Module (small green attachment).
- Manufacturer: iRobot
- Type: robot
- Released: 2007
- Website: edu.irobot.com

iRobot Create is a hobbyist robot manufactured by iRobot that was introduced in 2007 and based on their Roomba vacuum cleaning platform. The iRobot Create is explicitly designed for robotics development and improves the experience beyond simply hacking the Roomba. The Create replaces its Roomba predecessor's vacuum cleaner hardware with a cargo bay that also houses a DB-9 port providing serial communication, digital input & output, analog input & output, and an electric power supply. The Create also has a 7-pin Mini-DIN serial port through which sensor data can be read and motor commands can be issued using the iRobot Roomba Open Interface (ROI) protocol.

The platform accepts virtually all accessories designed for iRobot's second generation Roomba 400 Series domestic robots and can also be programmed with the addition of iRobot's own Command Module (a microcontroller with a USB connector and four DE-9 expansion ports). As of 2013, the Command Module is no longer being sold. In 2014, iRobot replaced the original model with the Create 2, which is constructed from the chassis of remanufactured 600-series Roombas; instead of replacing the old command module, iRobot encourages the use of commodity single-board micro-controllers like Arduino and single-board computers like Raspberry Pi to provide additional processing power.

== Controller ==
Due to the limitations in storage space and processing power of the iRobot Command Module, many choose to utilize an external computer in controlling the Create robot. Since the built-in serial port supports the transmission of sensor data and can receive actuation commands, any embedded computer that supports serial communication can be used as the control computer.

A number of robot interface server / simulators support the iRobot Create. Most notably, the Player Project has long included a device interface for the Roomba, and developed a Create interface in Player 2.1. The Universal Real-time Behavior Interface (URBI) environment also contains a Create interface.

The Microsoft Robotics Studio and the Webots simulation environment contain iRobot Create models.

== Versions ==
iRobot has released multiple versions of the Create robot.

Version	Release date	Differences from previous iteration	Notes
iRobot Create	2004	N/A	Based on iRobot Roomba 400
iRobot Create 2	2014	Safer electronics. Allows Create 2 to be sold outside the US	Based on iRobot Roomba 500/600
iRobot Create 3	2022	ROS2 built in. WiFi, USB, Ethernet, Bluetooth. New sensors including an IMU & optical floor tracking.	Based on iRobot Roomba i3

== Community ==
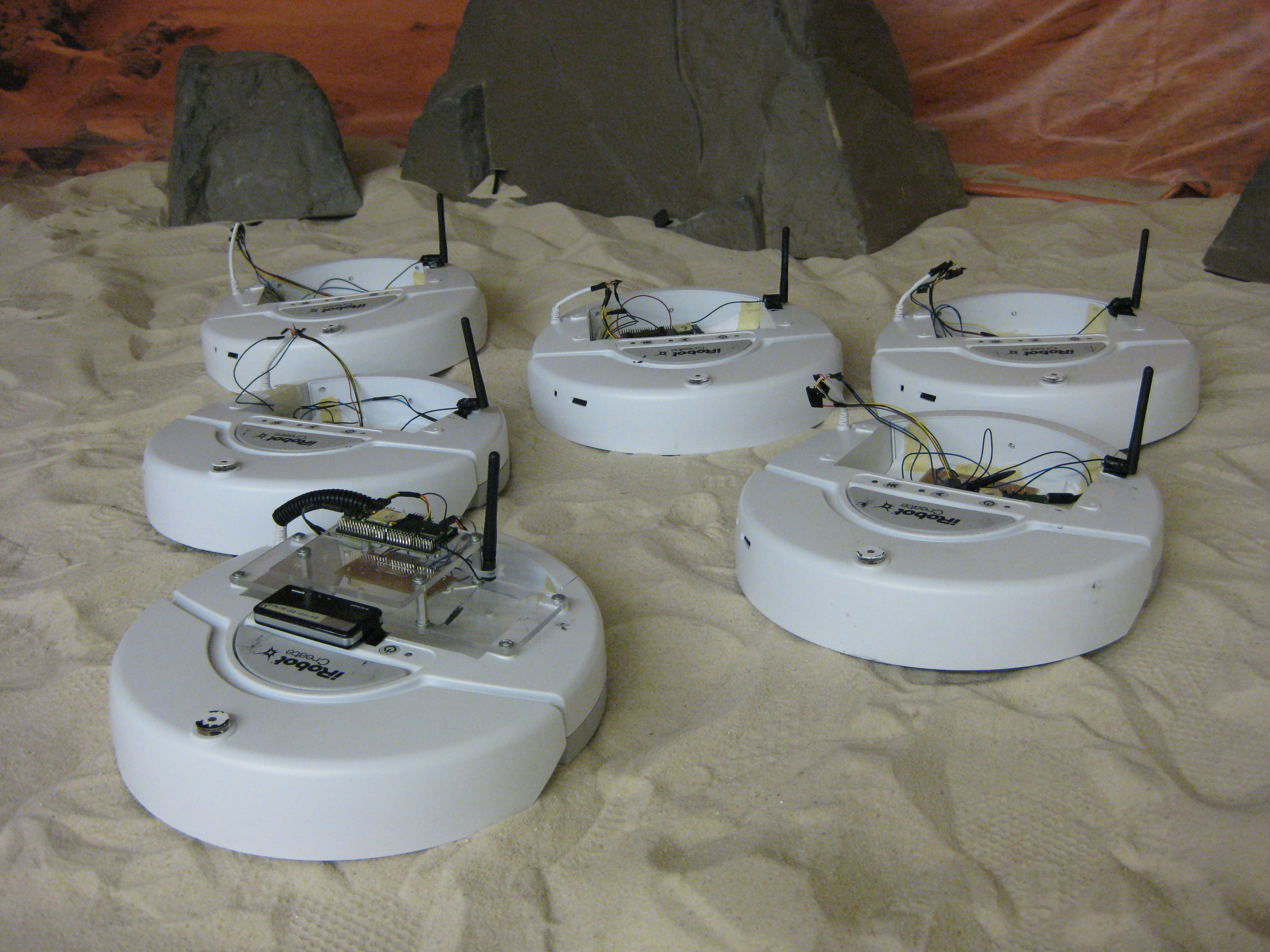
A team of iRobot Create robots at the Human-Automation Systems Lab, Georgia Institute of Technology.

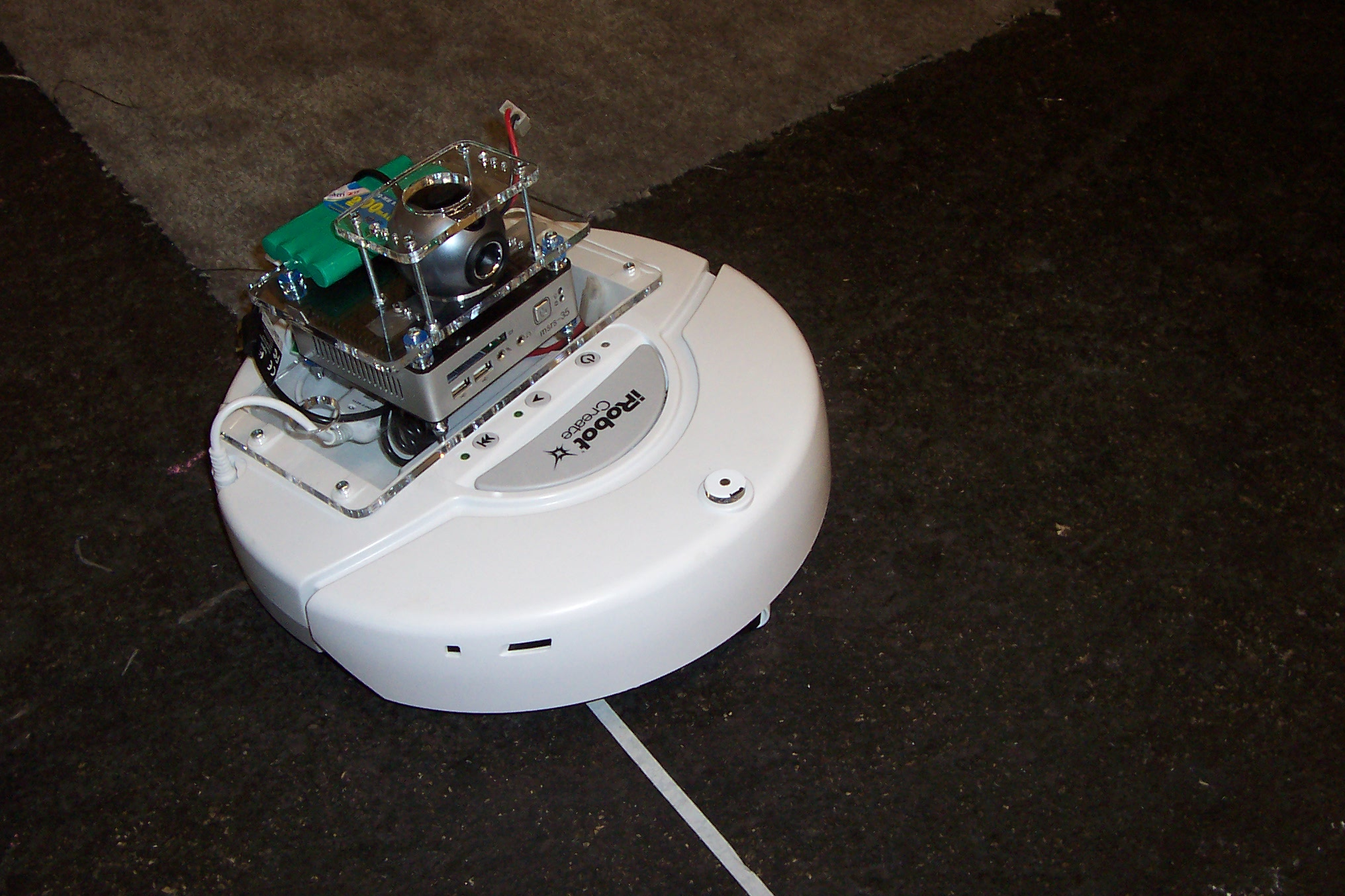
iRobot Create with mounted camera and single-board computer

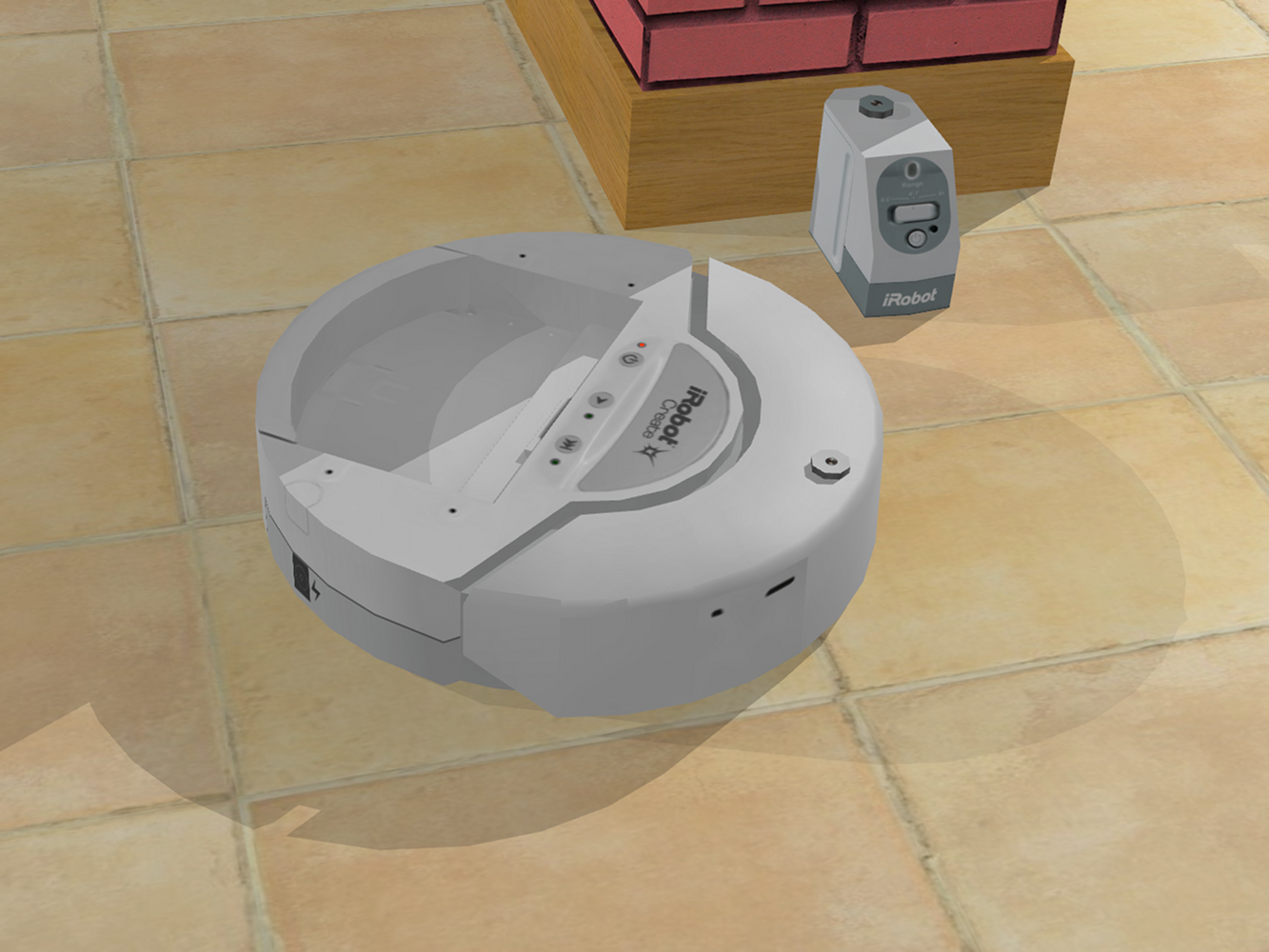
Simulation of an iRobot Create in Webots

The iRobot Create is popular in the robotic research and hobbyist community. Some examples of iRobot create projects:

- The iRobot Create has been included in parts kits for the International Botball Competition since 2007.
- The iRobot Create is model in the Webots robotics simulator
- The iRobot Create is used as the main platform for the Autonomous Robotics course at Brown University.
- The iRobot Create and a simulator developed in MATLAB are used in the Autonomous Mobile Robots course at Cornell University.
- For US$500, hacker Johnny Chung Lee created a Telepresence robot using the iRobot Create and a netbook.
- Combining the iRobot Create with an Xbox Kinect, student Philipp Robbel created a 3D mapping robot.

=== Competition ===
In 2007 iRobot hosted the "Create Challenge", offering US$5,000 with the goal of creating an "innovative robot that's functional, helpful, entertaining, whimsical or simply amazing". The winner was Danh Trinh, with their "Personal Home Robot" which "reminds owners to take their medication, turns lights on and off, and controls appliances."

== See also ==
- Lego Mindstorms
- Robotis Bioloid
- Big Trak
- Turtle robot
- Robot app store
