= DARwIn-OP =

Humanoid robot developed by Robotis

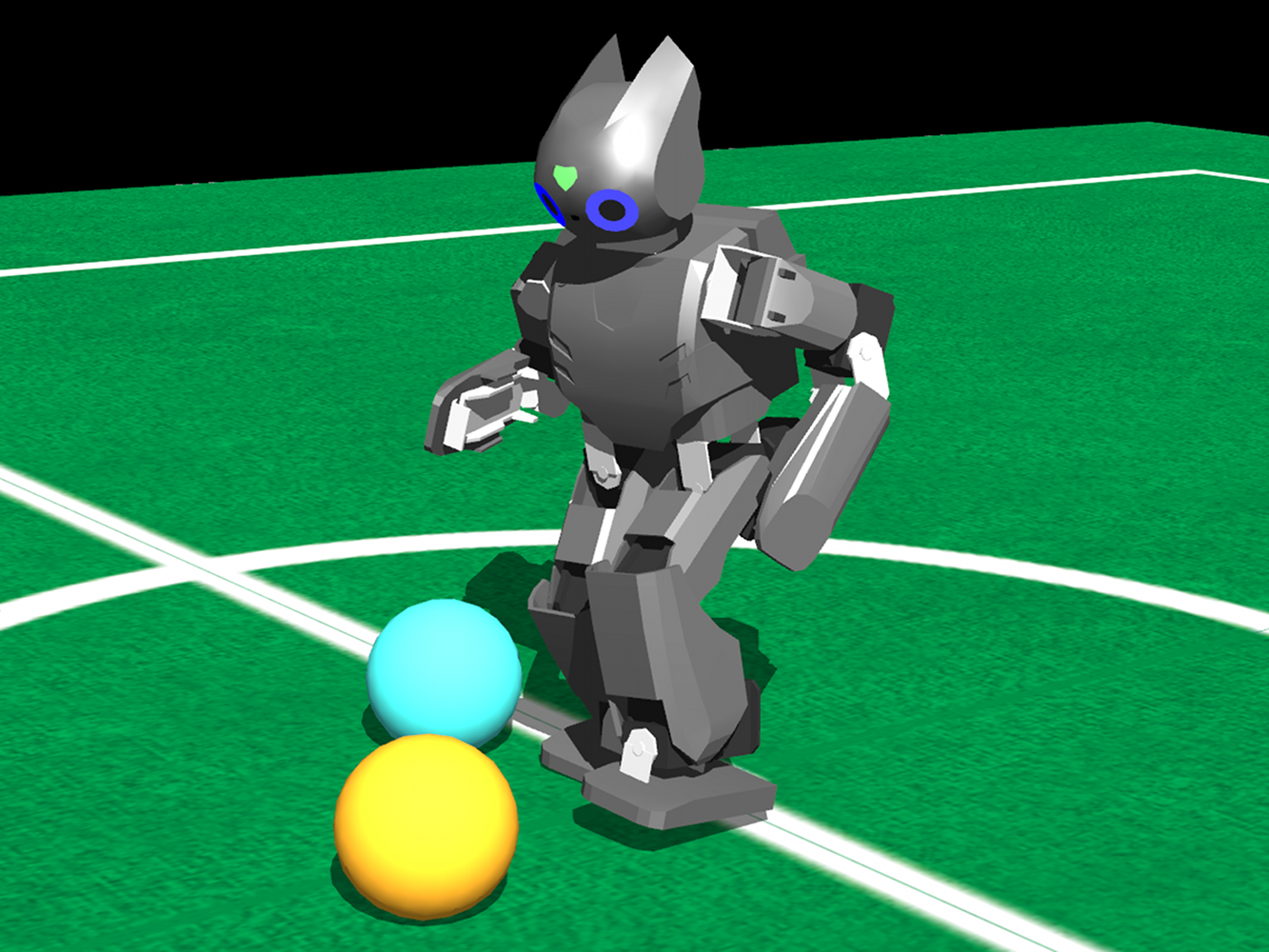
Simulation of a Robotis DARwIn-OP in Webots

DARwIn-OP (Dynamic Anthropomorphic Robot with Intelligence–Open Platform) is a miniature-humanoid robot platform developed and manufactured by Korean robot manufacturer Robotis in collaboration with Virginia Tech, Purdue University, and University of Pennsylvania. It is also supported by a $1.2 million NSF grant. DARwIn-OP has twenty degrees of freedom, each controlled by a DYNAMIXEL MX-28T servo motor.

DARwIn-OP's main purpose is for research and programmers in the fields of humanoid, artificial intelligence, gait algorithm, vision, inverse kinematics, and linguistics, among others.

DARwIn-OP is also the winner of the Kid Size League in the RoboCup 2011 2012 League, and 2013 League.

== See also ==
- Robotis Bioloid
