= IC programming =

IC programming is the process of transferring a software or firmware into an integrated circuit (IC), typically to enable the chip to perform specific tasks or functions. The process of IC programming usually requires an IC programmer, also known as a chip programmer, device programmer, or PROM writer, which is an electronic device used to load data into the non-volatile memory of programmable ICs.

IC programming can be performed either off-board, where the IC is removed from its PCB and programmed externally, or on-board, where the IC is programmed while still mounted on the device's circuit board. IC programming is essential in providing the ability to program a range of programmable ICs used in diverse applications, from consumer electronics to industrial systems.

The common types of programmable chips include:

- Programmable Read-Only Memory (PROM)
- Erasable Programmable Read-Only Memory (EPROM)
- Electrically Erasable Programmable Read-Only Memory (EEPROM)
- Flash memory
- Field Programmable Gate Arrays (FPGA)
- Microcontroller Units (MCU)
