= Robot Magazine =

- Editor: Greg Vogel
- Categories: Robotics
- Frequency: bi-monthly
- Publisher: Maplegate Media Group
- Founded: November 2005
- Final issue: 2017
- Country: USA
- Based in: Danbury, Connecticut
- Website: www.botmag.com
- ISSN: 1555-1016

Robot Magazine was an American bi-monthly robotics publication produced by the Maplegate Media Group.

== History and profile ==
Robot Magazine was conceived, designed, originally staffed and run for several years by then editor-in-chief, Tom Atwood. Launched in late 2005, the first cover featured the Mythbusters. Atwood called Jamie Hyneman at M5 Industries in San Francisco, and the two coordinated production of the first Robot cover as well as Hyneman's first story. The magazine was started as a quarterly publication and the first issue appeared in November 2005.

In January 2012 Greg Vogel became the editor-in-chief of Robot Magazine which was based in Danbury, Connecticut. In 2017 Maplegate Media has closed its doors and is out of business. Robot Magazine no longer exists.

Topics covered commonly included: how hobbyists can build and program robots from kits or from scratch, results of robot competitions and conventions, and how educators in colleges and high schools are incorporating the building and programming of robots into their teaching of science, engineering, and math.

== Columns and departments ==
Robot Magazine had a number of recurring columns that deal with various areas of robotics:

- UPDATE
- NAME THAT BOT!, a contest which challenges the reader to identify a prominent real-world or fictional robot.
- ROBOT FEED, the letters section.
- LERN, Leading Edge Robotics News.
- Combat Zone, a column that deals specifically with combat robotics and competitions.
- SNAPSHOT, a notable robot photograph.
- BOT SHOP REPORT, a home workshop report.
- PLUG & PLAY, product news.
- FUTURE BYTES, new developments in the lab.

== See also ==
- Make (magazine) – American DIY magazine (2005-)
