= Scott Hassan =

American computer scientist

Scott Hassan is an American computer programmer and entrepreneur who was the main programmer of the original Google Search engine, then known as BackRub. He was research assistant at Stanford University at the time, after working at Washington University's Medical Libraries Group (having been recruited out of SUNY Buffalo for the summer). Hassan left before Google was officially founded as a company. He bought 160,000 Google shares for $800 when the company was founded in 1998, which would be valued at more than $200 million when Google went public in 2004, and more than $13 billion as of 2021.

In 1997 Hassan founded FindMail, later renamed to eGroups.com, an email list management web site. He owned 5.7% of eGroups in March 2000 when the company filed a Form S-1. eGroups was later bought by Yahoo! for $432m in August 2000 in a stock deal and became Yahoo! Groups.

In 2006 Hassan started Willow Garage, a robotics research lab and technology incubator. The organization created the open source robotics software suite ROS (Robot Operating System). Willow Garage shut down in early 2014.

In 2011 Hassan spun off Suitable Technologies from Willow Garage. The new company made a video-conferencing robot which saw use by figures such as Edward Snowden and President Barack Obama. Suitable failed to become profitable and filed for bankruptcy in 2020, having lost $50 million between 2013 and 2018.
