= Open Robotics =

Nonprofit corporation in Mountain View, California

Coordinates: 37°27′08″N 122°09′58″W

- Formation: 2012
- Type: 501(c)(3) organization
- Purpose: Open-source software
- Headquarters: Mountain View, California, United States
- Region served: Worldwide
- Products: Robot Operating System, Gazebo simulator
- Subsidiaries: Open Source Robotics Corporation, Open Source Robotics Corporation Singapore
- Website: www.openrobotics.org

Open Robotics is a nonprofit corporation headquartered in Mountain View, California. It is the primary maintainer of the Robot Operating System, and the Gazebo simulator. Its stated mission is to support "the development, distribution and adoption of open source software for use in robotics research, education, and product development".

Open Robotics funds its operations through the contributions of various public and private organizations, some of whom also engage its services for the development of various robotics applications, robotics R&D and consulting. Notable sources of past and current funding include DARPA, NASA, Amazon, Bosch, Nvidia and the Toyota Research Institute.

== History ==
The beginnings of Open Robotics can be traced to Willow Garage, a robotics research lab and incubator created by Scott Hassan, an early Google engineer and billionaire technology entrepreneur. It was here that the first official Robot Operating System (ROS) distribution was released in May 2010, and quickly gained widespread adoption. Willow Garage was gradually dissolved in the ensuing years into several spin-offs, including the Open Source Robotics Foundation (OSRF), which was created in May 2012 to continue to shepherd the development of ROS and the Gazebo simulator.

OSRF's initial backers included Willow Garage and DARPA, which awarded OSRF its first contract to support open source simulation software for the DARPA Robotics Challenge. In subsequent years, OSRF also provided support for NASA's Space Robotics challenge and the DARPA Subterranean Challenge.

In September 2016, a taxable subsidiary named the Open Source Robotics Corporation (OSRC) was created to foster greater collaboration with industry. Together with OSRF, these two organizations came to be officially known as Open Robotics in May 2017. In 2018, Open Robotics opened its first overseas office in Singapore, and announced its collaboration with the Singapore Government to work on robotics applications for the healthcare sector.

In December 2022, OSRC and OSRC-SG (the Singapore entity) were acquired by Intrinsic, a subsidiary of Alphabet. OSRF remains an independent non-profit.

In April 15th, 2024 the OSRA (THE OPEN SOURCE Robotics Alliance) replaced the OSRC, the OSRC was sold to Intrinsic before the creation of the OSRA initiative, and both of those things are part of a single long-term plan by the OSRF to provide a stable future for ROS, Gazebo, Open-RMF, and the infrastructure that supports them.
