= TurtleBot =

- Developer: Community
- Written in: Various (Notably C++ and Python)
- OS family: ROS
- Working state: Current (TurtleBot 2)
- Source model: open source, open source hardware
- Initial release: 2011; 15 years ago
- Marketing target: Personal robots, mobile robots
- Default user interface: Many
- License: BSD, OSHW Statement of Principles and Definition v1.0

TurtleBot is a personal robot kit with open source software. It was created at Willow Garage by Melonee Wise and Tully Foote in November 2010.

== Versions ==
=== TurtleBot 1 ===
TurtleBot 1 consists of an iRobot Create base, a 3000 mAh battery pack, a TurtleBot power board with gyro, a Kinect sensor, an Asus 1215N laptop with a dual core processor, and a hardware mounting kit. The hardware mounting kit enables other sensors to be added afterwards.

=== TurtleBot 2 ===
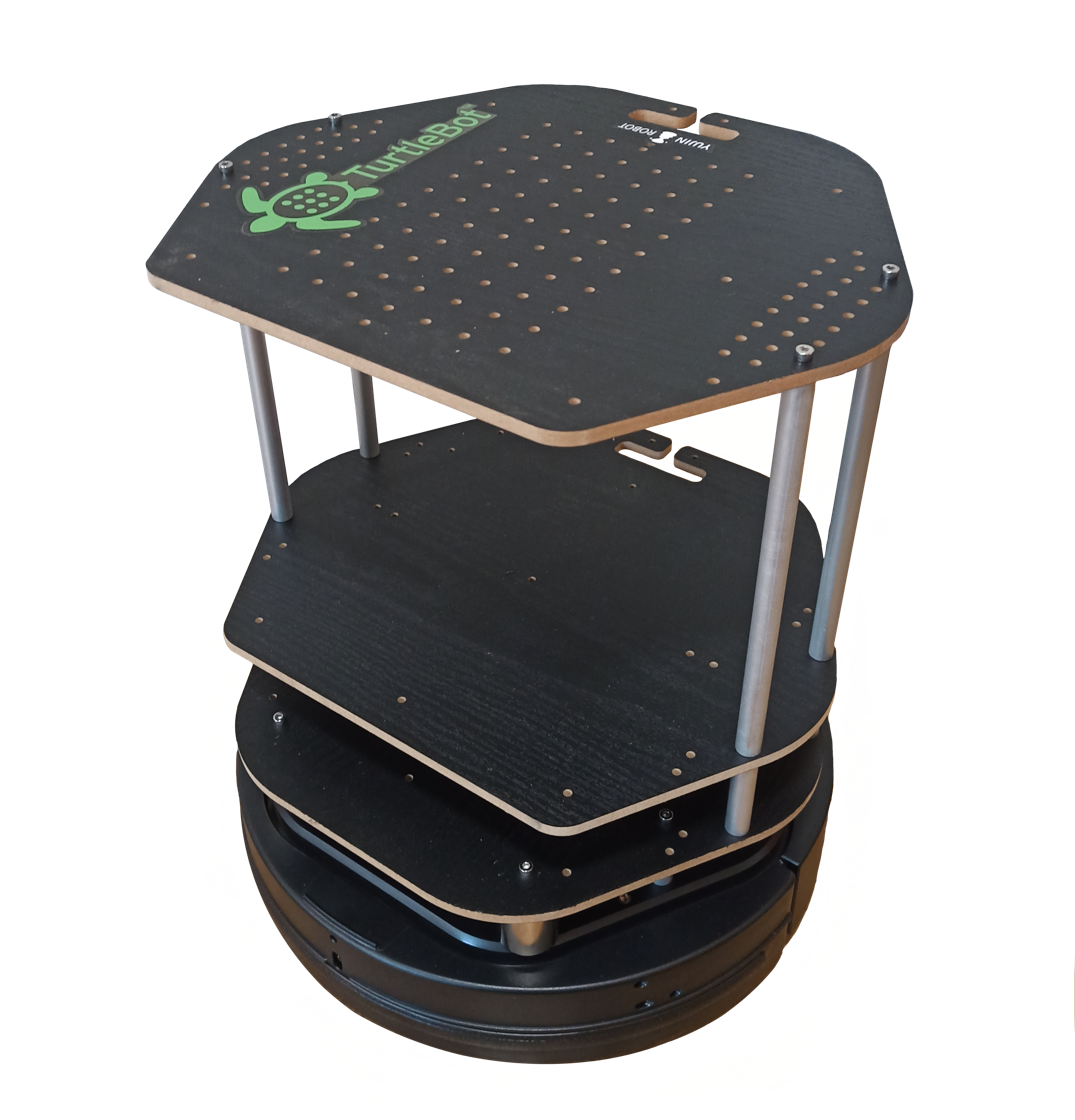
A TurtleBot 2

TurtleBot 2 received numerous upgrades to its predecessor. A YUJIN Kobuki mobile serves as its base outfitted with a 2200 mAh battery. The Kinect sensor and Asus 1215N laptop are reused from the TurtleBot 1. Turtlebot 2's package included a fast charger to decrease time between deployments.

The TurtleBot 2 also features the a hardware mounting kit (similar to the previous generation) allowing for additional sensors to be added more easily as needed. The improvements to the TurtleBot 2 make it a more versatile starting point for prototyping and exploring robotics applications.

=== TurtleBot 3 ===
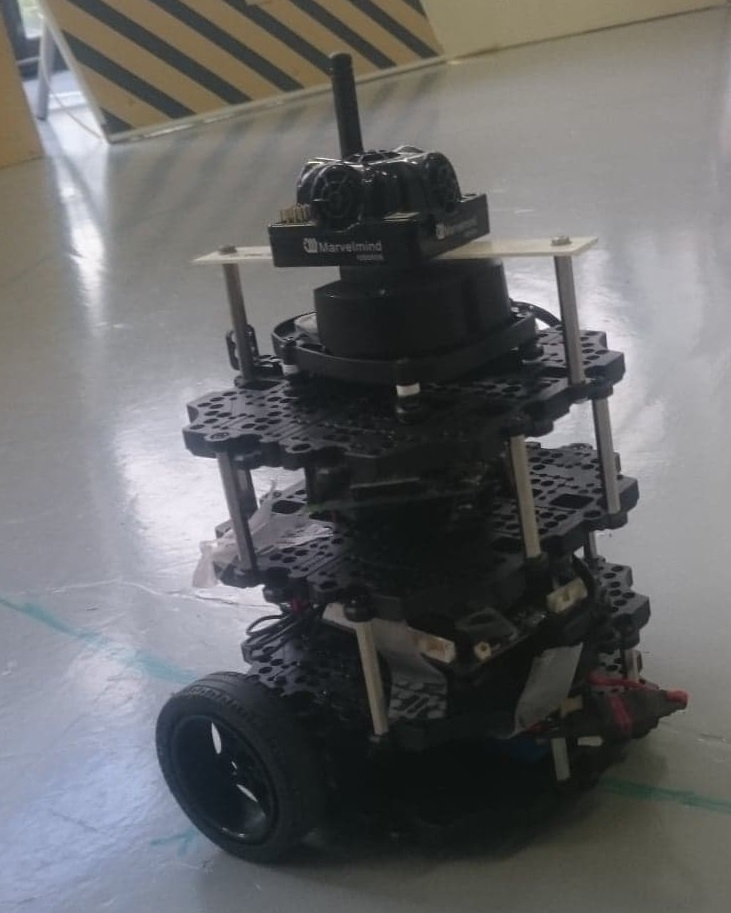
A Turtlebot 3

TurtleBot 3 has additional structural expansion capabilities due to the ROBOTIS’ modular structure along with the DYNAMIXEL.

=== TurtleBot 4 ===
TurtleBot 4 is using an iRobot Create3 robot as a base with a compute and sensor package consisting of a Raspberry PI 4, a LiDAR Scanner, and a RGB-D camera. TurtleBot 4 comes in two models – TurtleBot 4 Standard and TurtleBot 4 Lite. Both are equipped with an iRobot® Create3 mobile base, a Raspberry Pi 4 running ROS 2, OAK-D spatial AI stereo camera, 2D LiDAR and more. All components have been integrated to deliver a development and learning platform.

== Community ==
TurtleBot has been used in multi-robot research and human robot interaction research. TurtleBot has also been used by universities teaching introductory robotics courses.

== Licensing ==
TurtleBot is a licensed trademark that is maintained by the Open Source Robotics Foundation. The Open Source Robotics Foundation licenses the use of the TurtleBot trademark for manufacturing and distributing TurtleBot branded products.
