= Handy Board =

The Handy Board is a popular handheld robotics controller. The Handy Board was developed at MIT by Fred G. Martin, and was closely based on a previous controller designed by Martin and Randy Sargent for the MIT LEGO Robot Contest. The Handy Board design is licensed free of charge. Thus, several manufacturers make Handy Boards. The Handy Board is used by hundreds of schools worldwide and by many hobbyists for their robot projects.

== Handy Board specs ==
- 68HC11 8-bit microcontroller @ 2 MHz
- 32KB battery-backed SRAM
- 2x16 LCD character display
- Support for four 1A motors
- 6 Servo motor controllers
- 7 Digital and 9 Analog inputs
- 8 Digital and 16 Analog outputs
- Infrared I/O capabilities
- Serial interface capabilities
- Sound output
- 11 cm x 8.5 cm x 5.25 cm (lxwxh – with battery, expansion board, and lcd screen)

The Handy Board
