= Sustainability in construction =

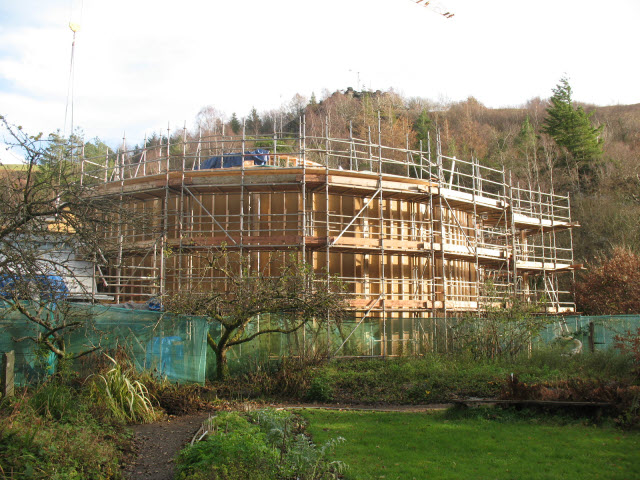
The Wales Institute for Sustainable Education was constructed with sustainable materials such as hempcrete and rammed earth.

Sustainable construction aims to reduce the negative health and environmental impacts caused by the construction process and by the operation and use of buildings and the built environment. It can be seen as the construction industry's contribution to more sustainable development. Precise definitions vary from place to place, and are constantly evolving to encompass varying approaches and priorities. More comprehensively, sustainability can be considered from three dimension of planet, people and profit across the entire construction supply chain. Recent research highlights that emerging sustainable construction materials—such as recycled concrete, bio-based composites, and low-carbon cements—can significantly reduce greenhouse gas emissions while maintaining structural performance.A 2024 study further emphasized that implementing circular economy stratigies, such as recycling construction and demolition waste, can significantly reduce the carbon footprint of building projects. Cement production is a major contributor to embodied carbon in construction. Globally, about two-thirds of CO₂ emissions from cement manufacturing come from the chemical process of clinker calcination and one-third from energy use (2018 baseline). Calcined clay and limestone combinations (such as LC3) can substitute up to 50% of traditional Portland clinker without compromising compressive strength, reducing embodied carbon dioxide emissions in commercial concrete blends by roughly 30% to 40%.

Key concepts include the protection of the natural environment, choice of non-toxic materials, reduction and reuse of resources, waste minimization, and the use of life-cycle cost analysis. Digital technology such as building information modeling (BIM) supports sustainable construction by optimizing material use, reducing waste during design and construction phases, and lowering the overall carbon footprint of building projects. BIM allows architects and engineers to simulate energy performance and material consumption before physical construction begins.

== Definition of sustainable construction ==
One definition of "Sustainable Construction" is the introduction of healthy living and workplace environments, the use of materials that are sustainable, durable and by extension environmentally friendly. In the United States, the Environmental Protection Agency (EPA) defines sustainable construction as "the practice of creating structures and using processes that are environmentally responsible and resource-efficient throughout a building's life-cycle from siting to design, construction, operation, maintenance, renovation and deconstruction." Agyekum-Mensah et al.. note that some definitions of sustainable construction and development "seem to be vague" and they question use of any definition of "sustainability" which suggests that sustainable or acceptable activities can be continued indefinitely, because construction projects do not run on indefinitely.

== Evolution path ==
In the 1970s, awareness of sustainability emerged, amidst oil crises. At that time, people began to realize the necessity and urgency of energy conservation, which is to use energy in an efficient way and find alternatives to contemporary sources of energy. Additionally, shortages of other natural resources at that time, such as water, also raised public attention to the importance of sustainability and conservation. In the late 1960s, the construction industry began to explore ecological approaches to construction.

The concept of sustainable construction was born out of sustainable development discourse. The term 'sustainable development' was first coined in the Brundtland report of 1987, defined as the ability to meet the needs of all people in the present without compromising the ability of future generations to meet their own. This report defined a turning point in sustainability discourse since it deviated from the earlier limits-to-growth perspective to focus more on achieving social and economic milestones, and their connection to environmental goals, particularly in developing countries. Sustainable development interconnects three socially concerned systems—environment, society and economy—a system seeking to achieve a range of goals as defined by the United Nations Development Program.

The introduction of sustainable development into the environmental/economical discourse served as a middle ground for the limits-to-growth theory, and earlier pro-growth theories that argued maintaining economic growth would not hinder long-term sustainability. As a result, scholars have faulted sustainable development for being too value-laden since applications of its definition vary heavily depending on relevant stakeholders, allowing it to be used in support of both pro-growth and pro-limitation perspectives of development arguments despite their vastly different implications. For the concept to be effective in real-life applications, several specified frameworks for its use in various fields and industries, including sustainable construction, were developed.

The construction industry's response to sustainable development is sustainable construction. In 1994, the definition of sustainable construction was given by Professor Charles J. Kibert during the Final Session of the First International Conference of CIB TG 16 on Sustainable Construction as "the creation and responsible management of a healthy built environment based on resource efficient and ecological principles". Notably, the traditional concerns in construction (performance, quality, cost) are replaced in sustainable construction by resource depletion, environmental degradation and healthy environment. Sustainable construction addresses these criteria through the following principles set by the conference:

- Minimize resource consumption (Conserve)by effective procurment systems and strategies
- Maximize resource reuse (Reuse)
- Use renewable or recyclable resources (Renew/Recycle/Repurpose
- Protect and incorporate the natural environment (Protect Nature)
- Create a healthy, non-toxic environment (Non-Toxics)
- Pursue quality in creating the built environment (Quality)

Additional definitions and frameworks for sustainable construction practices were more rigorously defined in the 1999 Agenda 21 on Sustainable Construction, published by the International Council for Research and Innovation in Building and Construction (CIB). The same council also published an additional version of the agenda for sustainable construction in developing countries in 2001 to counteract biases present in the original report as a result of most contributors being from the developed world.

Since 1994, much progress to sustainable construction has been made all over the world. According to a 2015 Green Building Economic Impact Study released by U.S. Green Building Council (USGBC), the green building industry contributes more than $134.3 billion in labor income to working Americans. The study also found that green construction's growth rate is rapidly outpacing that of conventional construction and will continue to rise.

In line with these principles, the reuse of industrial by-products in construction materials has gained increasing attention as a sustainable approach. Studies have shown that such materials can be effectively incorporated into infrastructure systems without compromising mechanical performance, thereby supporting resource efficiency and contributing to circular economy strategies. In particular, road construction offers significant potential for the reuse of waste and by-product materials due to its large material demands and layered structural design. Integrating such sustainable alternatives into road layers helps reduce the consumption of virgin aggregates, minimize waste disposal, and lower environmental impacts while maintaining or enhancing performance.

== Goals of sustainable construction ==
=== Current state ===
According to United Nations Environment Programme (UNEP), "the increased construction activities and urbanization will increase waste which will eventually destroy natural resources and wild life habitats over 70% of land surface from now up to 2032. " Moreover, construction uses around half of natural resources that humans consume. Production and transport of building materials consumes 25 – 50 percent of all energy used (depending on the country considered). Taking UK as an example, the construction industry counts for 47% of CO_{2} emissions, of which manufacturing of construction products and materials accounts for the largest amount within the process of construction.

=== Benefits ===
By implementing sustainable construction, benefits such as lower cost, environmental protection, sustainability promotion, and expansion of the market may be achieved during the construction phase. As mentioned in ConstructionExecutive, construction waste accounts for 34.7% of all waste in Europe. Implementing sustainability in construction would cut down on wasted materials substantially.

==== Potential lower cost ====
Sustainable construction might result in higher investment at the construction stage of projects, the competition between contractors, due to the promotion of sustainability in the industry, would encourage the application of sustainable construction technologies, ultimately decreasing the construction cost. Meanwhile, the encouraged cooperation of designer and engineer would bring better design into the construction phase.

Using more sustainable resources reduces cost of construction as there will be less water and energy being used for construction and with less resources being used in the projects, it would lead to lower disposal costs as there is less waste being made.

==== Environment protection ====
By adopting sustainable construction, contractors would make the construction plan or sustainable site plan to minimize the environmental impact of the project. According to a study took place in Sri Lanka, considerations of sustainability may influence the contractor to choose more sustainable, locally sourced products and materials, and to minimize the amount of waste and water pollution. Another example is from a case study in Singapore, the construction team implemented rainwater recycling and waste water treatment systems that help achieve a lower environmental impact. Additionally, a 2023 study in China found that adopting cross-laminated timber (CLT) in building design can significantly reduce embodied carbon emissions across the construction process compared to traditional concrete-based structures.

Adaptive reuse involves converting an existing building for a new purpose rather than demolishing it. A 2026 study conducted in Finland compared converting an office building into housing with constructing a replacement building. The researchers found that adaptive reuse resulted in 46% lower upfront greenhouse gas emissions and 19% lower emissions over a 50 year life cycle.

==== Promoting sustainability ====
Contractors delivering projects in a sustainable way in collaboration with owners, treating sustainability as a key performance indicator for the clients from day one "sends a clear message to the industry, 'sustainability is important to us' and this, especially within the government and public sectors can significantly drive change in the way projects are undertaken, as well as up-skilling the industry to meet this growing demand.

==== Expand market ====
There is be potential to expand the market of sustainable concepts or products. According to a report published by USGBC, "The global green building market grew in 2013 to $260 billion, including an estimated 20 percent of all new U.S. commercial real estate construction."

== Sustainable construction strategies ==
Globally, construction industries are attempting to implement sustainable construction principles. Below are some examples of successful implementations of sustainable construction promotion on a national level. Also included are new technologies that could improve the application of sustainable construction. Recent work identifies four main barriers to lowering embodied carbon—organizational, financial, policy/regulatory, and methodological/data—and recommends strategies such as setting explicit reduction targets, adopting regulation, and integrating digital assessment tools.

Recent research on net-zero carbon buildings emphasizes that reducing the environmental impact of construction requires addressing both embodied carbon and operational carbon. Embodied carbon is associated with building materials and construction processes, while operational carbon results from the energy used during a building's operation. Myint et al. (2025) identify energy-efficiency improvements, renewable energy adoption, and circular economy principles as important strategies for reducing emissions in buildings. Their review also highlights legislative, financial, cultural, technological, and stakeholder-related challenges that can affect the implementation of net-zero building practices.

Myint, Nwe Ni; Shafique, Muhammad; Zhou, Xiangming; Zheng, Zhuang (2025). "Net zero carbon buildings: A review on recent advances, knowledge gaps and research directions". Case Studies in Construction Materials. 22: e04200. https://doi.org/10.1016/j.cscm.2024.e04200.

=== Strategic Policy and Guide ===
- Creation of a national strategy to improve the development: the government of Singapore announced a Sustainable Singapore Blueprint in April 2009, launching a long-term strategy of sustainable construction development. Another example is Strategy for sustainable construction in the UK.
- Investing money on research and education : S$50 million "Research Fund for the Built Environment" was launched in 2007 by Singapore Government to kick-start R&D efforts in sustainable development.
- Guidance for sustainable application: Government department cooperating with academic institutes to make an industrial guide for workers, for example, the Field Guide for Sustainable Construction published in 2004.
- The "circular economy" has been identified as a possible way to help construction become sustainable. CE is a concept that is designed on keeping materials and resources in a closed loop. Many countries have pledged to create policies around implementing this concept, including the EU, USA, Australia, and many in South America.

=== Changing Mindset in the Way of Development ===
The Government in Singapore has developed a Sustainable Construction Master Plan with the hope to transform the industrial development path from only focusing on the traditional concerns of "cost, time, and quality" to construction products and materials, to reduce natural resource consumption and minimize waste on site. With the expediting concern of the climate crisis, it is essential to keep in mind the importance of reducing energy consumption and toxic waste whilst moving forward with sustainable architectural plans.

=== New Technologies ===
The development of efficiency codes has prompted the development of new construction technologies and methods, many pioneered by academic departments of construction management that seek to improve efficiency and performance while reducing construction waste.

New techniques of building construction are being researched, made possible by advances in 3D printing technology. In a form of additive building construction, similar to the additive manufacturing techniques for manufactured parts, building printing is making it possible to flexibly construct small commercial buildings and private habitations in around 20 hours, with built-in plumbing and electrical facilities, in one continuous build, using large 3D printers. Working versions of 3D-printing building technology are already printing 2 metres (6 ft 7 in) of building material per hour as of January 2013, with the next-generation printers capable of 3.5 metres (11 ft) per hour, sufficient to complete a building in a week. Dutch architect Janjaap Ruijssenaars's performative architecture 3D-printed building was scheduled to be built in 2014. A 2025 systematic literature review and framework development study found that integrating net-zero principles across construction material supply chains—via life-cycle assessment, digital tools (BIM), and stakeholder coordination—is critical for reducing embodied carbon and aligning with global climate targets.

Over the years, the construction industry has started IT adoption, something it previously found hard to compete with when paired against other fields such as, the manufacturing or healthcare industries. Nowadays, construction is starting to see the full potential of technological advancements, moving on to paperless construction, using the power of automation and adopting BIM, the internet of things, cloud storage and co-working, and mobile apps, implementation of surveying drones, and more.

In the current trend of sustainable construction, the recent movements of New Urbanism and New Classical architecture promote a sustainable approach towards construction, that appreciates and develops smart growth, architectural tradition and classical design. This is in contrast to modernist and short-lived globally uniform architecture, as well as opposing solitary housing estates and suburban sprawl. Both trends started in the 1980s.

Timber is being introduced as a feasible material for skyscrapers (nicknamed "plyscrapers") thanks to new developments incorporating engineered timber, whose collective name is "mass timber" and includes cross-laminated timber.

Industrial hemp is becoming increasingly recognised as an eco-friendly building material. It can be used in a range of ways, including as an alternative to concrete (known as 'hempcrete'), flooring, and insulation. King Charles is reported to have used hemp to insulate an eco-home. In December 2022, the United Nations Conference on Trade and Development (UNCTAD) emphasised hemp's versatility and sustainability, and advocated its use as a building material, in a report entitled 'Commodities at a glance: Special issue on industrial hemp'.

The sustainability of the construction industry is closely to the choice of building materials. As concern for environmental protection and sustainable has been growing, people are increasingly focusing on low-carbon and environmental protection. If bamboo were used as building material, construction could also become carbon-friendly and environmentally sustainable. Bamboo is not only strong and environmentally friendly, but also has a very strong reproductive capacity. Choosing the right material is therefore, very important for the construction industry.

A 2025 review identified supplementary cementitious materials, alkali-activated and geopolymer binders, carbon capture and utilization, and recycled aggregates as promising approaches to reducing emissions from concrete production. These approaches could collectively reduce emissions by up to 30–50%, although technical, economic, and supply-chain challenges remain.

== Sustainable construction in developing countries ==
Specific parameters are needed for sustainable construction projects in developing countries. Scholar Chrisna Du Plessis of the Council for Scientific and Industrial Research (CSIR) defines the following key issues as specific to work in developing countries:

- New, non-western frameworks for development
- Understanding the connection between urbanization and rural development
- Sustainable housing solutions
- Education
- Innovative materials
- Innovative methods of construction
- Merging modern and traditional practices
- Promoting equity in gender roles
- Development of new financing systems
- Improving the capacity of the government and the construction industry

In a later work, Du Plessis furthers the definition of sustainable construction to touch on the importance of sustainability in social and economic contexts as well. This is especially relevant in construction projects in the Global South, where local value systems and social interactions may differ from the western context in which sustainable construction frameworks were developed.

=== Debates surrounding sustainable construction in developing countries ===
First, the need for sustainable development measures in developing countries is considered. Most scholars have reached a consensus on the concept of the 'double burden' placed on developing countries as a result of the interactions between development and the environment. Developing countries are uniquely vulnerable to problems of both development (resource strain, pollution, waste management, etc.) and under-development (lack of housing, inadequate water and sanitation systems, hazardous work environments) that directly influence their relationship with the surrounding environment. Additionally, scholars have defined two classes of environmental problems faced by developing countries; 'brown agendas' consider issues that cause more immediate environmental health consequences on localized populations, whereas 'Green Agendas' consider issues that address long-term, wide-scope threats to the environment. Typically, green agenda solutions are promoted by environmentalists from developed, western countries, leading them to be commonly criticized as being elitist and ignorant to the needs of the poor, especially since positive results are often delayed due to their long-term scope. Scholars have argued that sometimes these efforts can even end up hurting impoverished communities; for example, conservation initiatives often lead to restrictions on resource-use despite the fact that many rural communities rely on these resources as a source of income, forcing households to either find new livelihoods or find different areas for harvesting. General consensus is that the best approaches to sustainable construction in developing countries is through a merging of brown and green agenda ideals.

=== Stakeholders ===
==== Foreign investors and organizations ====
Since all of the definitions and frameworks for the major concepts outlined previously are developed by large international organizations and commissions, their research and writings directly influence the organization, procedures, and scale of rural development projects in the Global South. Attempts at community development by foreign organizations like the ones discussed have questionable records of success. For instance, billions of dollars of aid have flowed into Africa over the past 60 years to address infrastructure shortcomings, yet this aid has created numerous social and economic problems without making any progress toward infrastructure development. One compelling explanation for why infrastructure projects as a result of foreign aid have failed in the past is that they are often eurocentric in modelling and applied off successful strategies used in western countries without adapting to local needs, environmental circumstances and cultural value systems.

==== NGOs/Non-profits ====
Often NGOs and development nonprofits are criticized for taking over responsibilities that are traditionally carried out by the state, causing governments to become ineffective in handling these responsibilities over time. Within Africa, NGOs carry out the majority of sustainable building and construction through donor-funded, low-income housing projects.

== Future development ==
Currently, sustainable construction has become mainstream in the construction industry. The increasing drive to adopt a better way of construction, stricter industrial standards and the improvement of technologies have lowered the cost of applying the concept, according to Business Case For Green Building Report. A 2025 Canada Green Building Council report indicates sustainable buildings can be constructed at or below typical costs when sustainability is integrated early by an experienced design team, although upfront cost barriers remain and savings are not guaranteed.

== See also ==
- Alternative natural materials – Natural materials that are not as commonly used as building materials
- Autonomous building – Building designed to be independent from public infrastructure
- Biophilic design – Nature-inspired design
- Development Fund of the Swedish Construction Industry
- Ecological design – Design approach sensitive to environmental impacts
- Energy-efficient landscaping
- Environmental engineering – Engineering discipline related to environmental science
- Environmental surveying – Profession of impact assessment
- Green building – Environmentally responsible construction principles
- Hempcrete – Biocomposite material used for construction and insulation
- Natural building – Sustainable construction practice
- Sustainable architecture – Architecture designed to minimize environmental impact
