= Construction 3D printing =

Using 3D printing to construct buildings

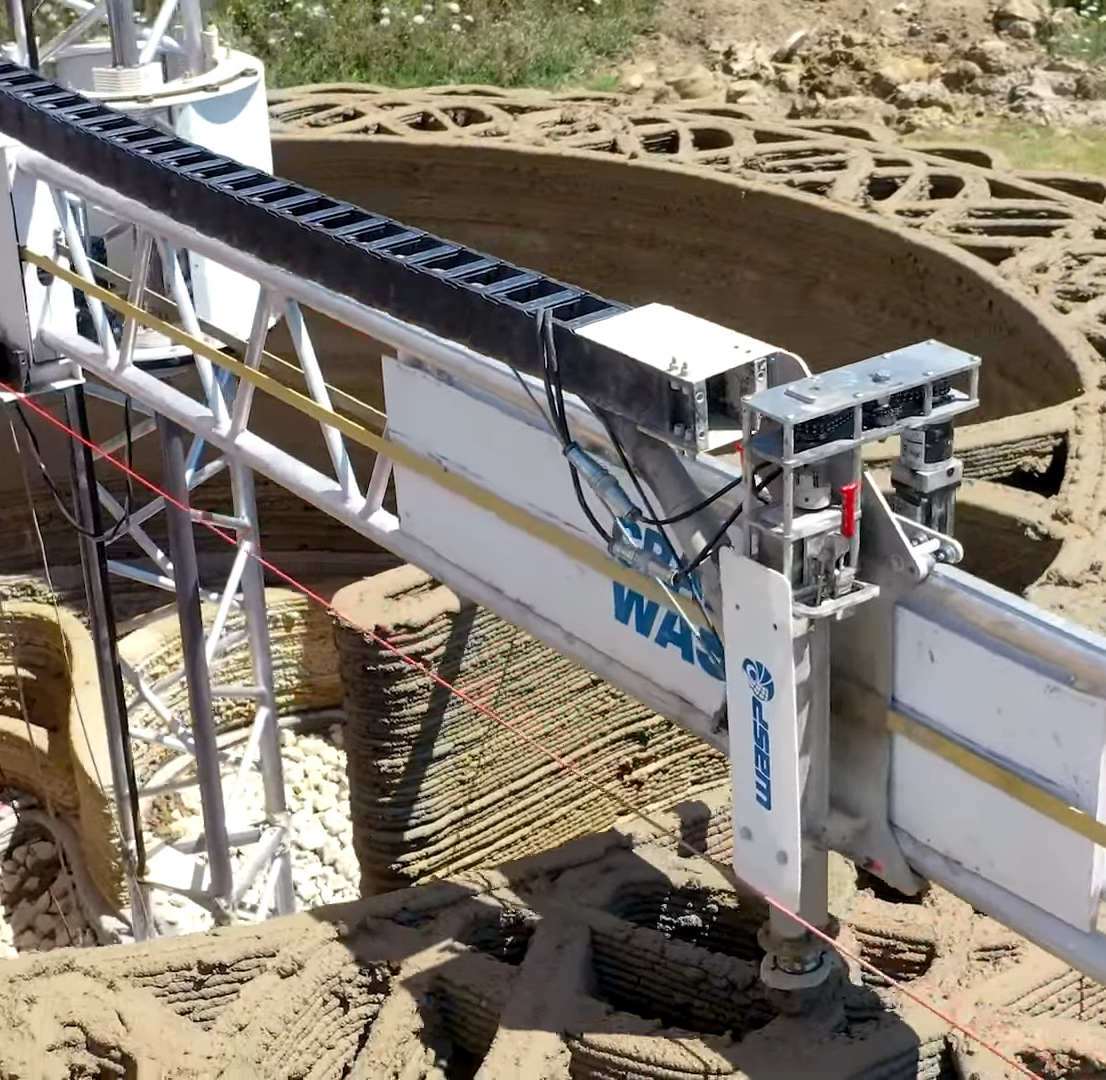
Close-up of a 3D-printer arm constructing a structure onsite using local soil as part of the construction material.

Construction 3D Printing (c3Dp) or 3D construction Printing (3DCP) refers to various technologies that use 3D printing as a core method to fabricate buildings or construction components. Alternative terms for this process include "additive construction." "3D Concrete" refers to concrete extrusion technologies whereas autonomous robotic construction System (ARCS), large-scale additive manufacturing (LSAM), and freeform construction (FC) refer to other sub-groups.

At construction scale, the main 3D-printing methods are extrusion (concrete/cement, wax, foam, polymers), powder bonding (polymer bond, reactive bond, sintering), and additive welding.

A number of different approaches have been demonstrated to date, which include on-site and off-site fabrication of buildings and construction components, using industrial robots, gantry systems, and tethered autonomous vehicles. Demonstrations of construction 3D printing technologies have included fabrication of housing, construction components (cladding and structural panels and columns), bridges and civil infrastructure, artificial reefs, follies, and sculptures.

3D concrete printing is an emerging technology with the potential to transform building and infrastructure construction by reducing time, material usage, labor requirements, and overall costs, while also enhancing sustainability and minimizing environmental impact. Despite its promise, the technology faces several challenges, including the development and optimization of material mixes, ensuring process consistency and quality control, maintaining structural integrity and durability, and addressing gaps in industry regulation and standardization.

== History ==
=== William Urschel ===
External videos
- Early 3D construction printing - Historical video of the patented inventions by Urschel.

In 1939 William Urschel created the world's first 3D concrete printed building in Valparaiso, Indiana. Urschel patented many of his construction inventions and even had 3D printing that used tongue and groove structural designs.

=== Seeding technologies 1950–1995 ===
Robotic bricklaying was conceptualized at explored in the 1950s and related technology development around automated construction began in the 1960s, with pumped concrete and isocyanate foams. Development of automated fabrication of entire buildings using slip forming techniques and robotic assembly of components, akin to 3D printing, were pioneered in Japan to address the dangers of building high rise buildings by Shimizu and Hitachi in the 1980s and 1990s. Many of these early approaches to on-site automation foundered because of the construction 'bubble', their inability to respond to novel architectures and the problems of feeding and preparing materials to the site in built up areas.

=== Early developments 1995–2000 ===
Early construction 3D printing development and research have been under way since 1995. Two methods were invented, one by Joseph Pegna which was focused on a sand/cement forming technique which used steam to selectively bond the material in layers or solid parts, though this technique was never demonstrated.

The second technique, Contour Crafting by Behrohk Khoshnevis, initially began as a novel ceramic extrusion and shaping method, as an alternative to the emerging polymer and metal 3D printing techniques, and was patented in 1995. Khoshnevis realized that this technique could exceed these techniques where "current methods are limited to fabrication of part dimensions that are generally less than one meter in each dimension". Around 2000, Khoshnevis's team at USC Vertibi began to focus on construction scale 3D printing of cementitious and ceramic pastes, encompassing and exploring automated integration of modular reinforcement, built-in plumbing and electrical services, within one continuous build process. This technology has only been tested at lab scale to date and controversially and allegedly formed the basis for recent efforts in China.

=== First generation 2000–2010 ===
In 2003, Rupert Soar secured funding and formed the freeform construction group at Loughborough University, UK, to explore the potential for up-scaling existing 3D printing techniques for construction applications. In 2005, the group secured funding to build a large-scale construction 3D printing machine using 'off the shelf' components (concrete pumping, spray concrete, gantry system) to explore how complex such components could be and realistically meet the demands for construction.

In 2005, Enrico Dini, Italy, patented the D-Shape technology, employing a massively scaled powder jetting/bonding technique over an area approximately 6 by 6 by 3 metres (20 ft × 20 ft × 10 ft). This technique although originally developed with epoxy resin bonding system was later adapted to use inorganic bonding agents. This technology has been used commercially for a range of projects in construction and other sectors including for artificial reefs.

In 2008 3D Concrete Printing began at Loughborough University, UK, headed by Richard Buswell and colleagues to extend the groups prior research and look to commercial applications moving from a gantry based technology to an industrial robot.

=== Second generation 2010–present ===
Buswell's group succeeded in licensing that robotic technology to Skanska in 2014. On January 18, 2015, the company drew press coverage with its unveiling of two buildings that integrated 3D-printed components: a mansion-style villa and a five-story tower. In May 2016, a new office building opened in Dubai, a 250-square-metre (2,700 ft^{2}) space, touted by Dubai's Museum of the Future as the world's first 3D-printed office building.

In 2017, a project to build a 3D-printed skyscraper in the United Arab Emirates was announced. Cazza construction would help to build the structure. At present there are no specific details, such as the buildings height or exact location.

FreeFAB Wax, invented by James B Gardiner and Steven Janssen at Laing O'Rourke, has been in development since March 2013. The technique uses construction scale 3D-printing to produce high volumes of engineered wax (up to 400 L/h or 110 US gal/h) to fabricate a 'fast and dirty' 3D-printed mould for precast concrete, glass fibre-reinforced concrete (GRC), and other sprayable/cast-able materials. The casting surface is then five-axis milled, removing approximately 5 mm (0.20 in) of wax, to create a high-quality mold (with approximately 20 μm (800 μin) surface roughness). After curing, the mold is then either crushed or melted, with the wax filtered and reused, significantly reducing waste, as compared with conventional mold technologies. The benefits of the technology are its fast mold fabrication, increased production efficiencies, reduced labor, and virtual elimination of waste through material reuse for molds. The system was originally demonstrated in 2014, using an industrial robot. The system was later adapted to integrate with a five-axis, high-speed gantry to achieve the rapid surface-milling tolerances, required for the system.

The US Army Corps of Engineers, Engineer Research Development Center, led by the Construction Engineering Research Laboratory (ERDC-CERL), in Champaign, Illinois, began research in deployable construction 3D-printer technology starting in September 2015. The pilot project, Automated Construction for Expeditionary Structures (ACES), focused on concrete 3D printing and covered a broad range of research areas, including printing systems, printable concrete materials, structural design and testing, and construction methods. The ACES project resulted in three demonstrations: an entry control point, the first reinforced additively constructed concrete barracks, and the printing of civil and military infrastructure (Jersey barriers, T-walls, culverts, bunkers, and fighting position) at the US Army Maneuver Support, Sustainment, and Protection Experiments (MSSPIX).

In 2017 ERDC CERL began working with the US Marine Corps, resulting in the first demonstration of concrete 3D printing by military personnel, a structurally enhanced reinforced 3D printed concrete barracks hut, the first 3D printed bridge in the Americas, and the first demonstration of printing with a 76 mm (3 in) nozzle. Through this work, ERDC and the Marines were able to test structural performance of reinforced 3D printed concrete wall assemblies and bridge beams, print system resilience and maintenance cycles, extended printing operations, the publicized 24-hour building claim, and develop viable reinforcement and construction methods using conventionally accepted practices.

MX3D Metal founded by Loris Jaarman and team has developed two six-axis robotic 3D printing systems, the first uses a thermoplastic which is extruded, notably this system allows the fabrication of freeform non-planar beads. The second is a system that relies on additive welding (essentially spot welding on previous spot welds) the additive welding technology has been developed by various groups in the past. MX3D worked on the fabrication and installation of the metal bridge in Amsterdam for six years. The completed pedestrian and bicycle bridge was opened in July 2021. The bridge has a span of 12 m (40 ft) and a final mass of 4,500 kg (10,000 lb) of stainless steel.

BetAbram is a simple gantry based concrete extrusion 3D printer developed in Slovenia. This system is available commercially, offering three models to consumers since 2013. The largest can print objects up to 16 by 9 by 2.5 metres (52 ft × 30 ft × 8 ft). Total Custom concrete 3D printer developed by Rudenko is a concrete deposition technology mounted in a gantry configuration, the system has a similar output to Winsun and other concrete 3D printing technologies, however it uses a lightweight truss type gantry. The technology has been used to fabricate a backyard scale version of a castle and a hotel room in the Philippines.

Serial production of construction printers was launched by SPECAVIA company, based in Yaroslavl, Russia. In May 2015, the company introduced the first model of a construction 3D printer and announced the start of sales.

XtreeE, a French firm co‑founded in 2015 by a multidisciplinary team following the DEMOCRITE university research project linking ENSA Paris‑Malaquais, Arts et Métiers ParisTech (PIMM/CNAM), ENSCI‑Les Ateliers and Inria, has developed a multi‑component concrete printing system mounted on a six‑axis industrial robot.

Since 2015 XtreeE has partnered with major construction groups. VINCI Construction formed a partnership and took an equity stake, and in 2021 LafargeHolcim France became a reference shareholder; Saint‑Gobain, via Point.P Travaux Publics, collaborated on pilot public‑works such as a 5‑ton stormwater overflow in the Lille area and sewer access structures.

3DPrinthuset, a Danish 3DPrinting startup, has also branched into construction with its sister company COBOD International, which made its own gantry-based printer in October 2017.

SQ4D (formerly S-Squared 3D Printers Inc.) is a construction 3D printer company based on Long Island, New York, that manufactures a large-format concrete construction printer called the Autonomous Robotic Construction System (ARCS). Media coverage describes ARCS as printing major portions of a house on-site, including elements such as the footings, foundation, and interior and exterior walls, with insulation and other components incorporated as part of the completed builds, which the company has used as demonstrations of the technology. In 2021, multiple news outlets reported that SQ4D listed what it described as the first 3D-printed house for sale in the United States, located in Riverhead, New York.

In 2021, Mario Cucinella Architects and 3D printing specialists WASP demonstrated the first 3D printing of a house made out of a clay-mixture, Tecla.

In 2022, engineers reported the development of swarms of autonomous 3D-printing drones for additive manufacturing and repair. In 2022, Lennar and ICON constructed Wolf Ranch, a community of 3D printed homes and the largest in the US.

In November 2022, researchers at the University of Maine Advanced Structures and Composites Center completed a 56-square-metre (600 ft^{2}) home composed of modular sections printed from wood byproducts.

3D printing of the building envelope alone does not resolve time- and cost-intensive construction elements such as reinforcement, utilities, and interior finishes, which limits the overall competitiveness of the process compared to conventional methods in many scenarios. In response to these limitations, a second generation of construction 3D printing platforms is emerging. These systems combine additive manufacturing with complementary operations such as manipulation, cutting/drilling, placement, or inspection, using robotic automation, sensors, and artificial intelligence. In 2024–2025, pilot projects were demonstrated in Spain, including the inauguration of a building constructed using 3D printing, robotics, and artificial intelligence, with automated finishing and full regulatory certification.

== Design ==
Architect James Bruce Gardiner designed two projects, Freefab Tower in 2004 and the Villa Roccia in 2009–2010. FreeFAB Tower was based on the original concept to combine a hybrid form of construction 3D printing with modular construction. Influences can be seen in various designs used by Winsun, including articles on the Winsun's original press release and office of the future. The FreeFAB Tower project also depicts the first speculative use of multi-axis robotic arms in construction 3D printing, the use of such machines within construction has grown steadily in recent years with projects by MX3D and Branch Technology.

The Villa Roccia 2009–2010 took this work a step further with the a design for a Villa at Porto Rotondo, Sardinia, Italy in collaboration with D-Shape. The design for the Villa focused on the development of a site specific architectural language influenced by the rock formations on the site and along the coast of Sardinia, while also taking into account the use of a panellised prefabricated 3D printing process. The project went through prototyping and didn't proceed to full construction.

Francios Roche (R&Sie) developed the exhibition project and monograph 'I heard about' in 2005 which explored the use of a highly speculative self propelling snake like autonomous 3D printing apparatus and generative design system to create high rise residential towers.

Dutch architect Janjaap Ruijssenaars's performative architecture 3D-printed building was planned to be built by a partnership of Dutch companies. The house was planned to be built in the end of 2014, but this deadline wasn't met. The companies have said that they are still committed to the project.

== Structures ==
3D concrete printing technology is used in the construction of thin-walled wall structures that do not require thermal insulation conditions.

Civil‑infrastructure pilots include a 5‑ton stormwater overflow structure printed and installed near Lille in 2017 by Point.P Travaux Publics, SADE and XtreeE, followed in 2018 by 3D‑printed concrete inspection chambers for the Métropole Européenne de Lille (Roubaix) based on laser scanning of a 19th‑century sewer.

=== 3D printed buildings ===
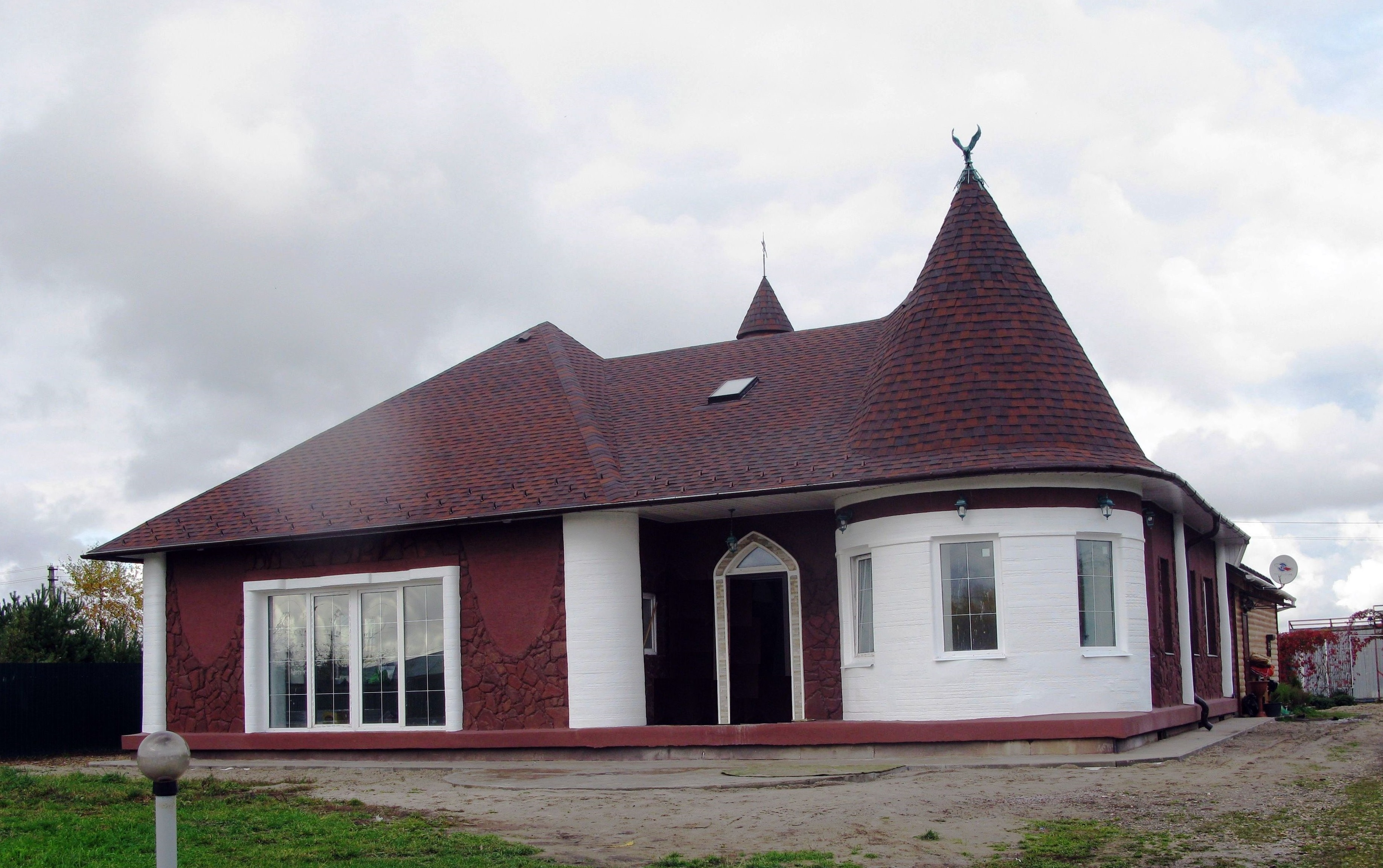
Europe's first 3D-printed residential house

The 3D Print Canal House was a construction project.

The first residential building in Europe and the CIS, constructed using the 3D printing construction technology, was the home in Yaroslavl (Russia) with the area of 298.5 square metres (3,213 ft^{2}). The walls of the building were printed by the company SPECAVIA in December 2015. A total of 600 elements of the walls were printed in the shop and assembled at the construction site. After completing the roof structure and interior decoration, the company presented a fully finished 3D building in October 2017.

Dutch and Chinese demonstration projects are slowly constructing 3D-printed buildings in China, Dubai and the Netherlands, using the effort to educate the public to the possibilities of the new plant-based building technology and to spur greater innovation in 3D printing of residential buildings. A small concrete house was 3D-printed in 2017.

The Building on Demand (BOD), the first 3D printed house in Europe, is a project led by COBOD International for a small 3D printed office hotel in Copenhagen, Nordhavn area. As of 2018, the building stands fully completed and furbished.

In France, the Viliaprint project led by social housing provider Plurial Novilia inaugurated on 2 June 2022 five rental houses in the Réma'Vert eco‑district of Reims. The dwellings were built with a hybrid method combining off‑site 3D‑printed concrete walls produced by XtreeE and prefabricated elements, under an ATEx approval issued by the CSTB in November 2020.

=== 3D printed bridges ===
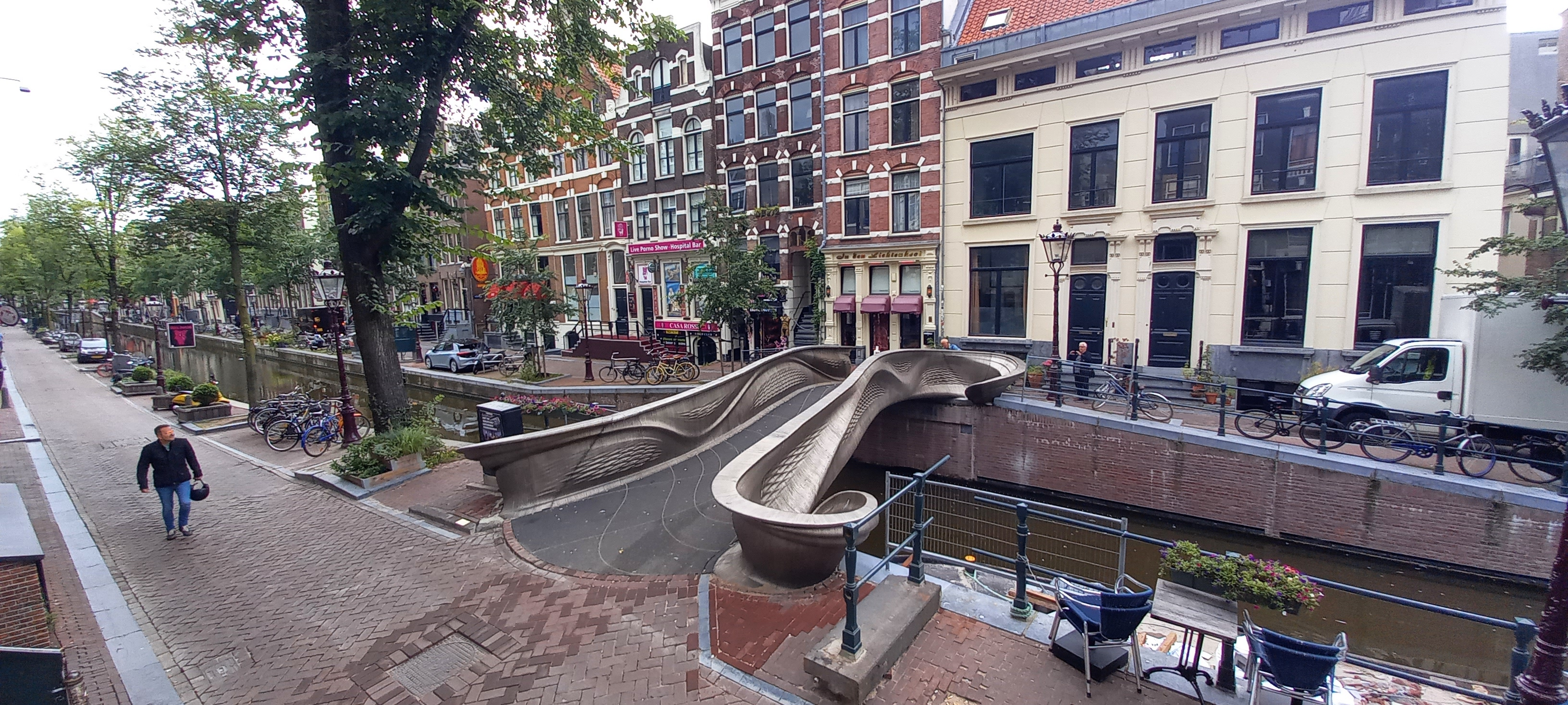
Amsterdam is home of the world's first 3D printed steel bridge.

In Spain, the first pedestrian bridge printed in 3D in the world (3DBRIDGE) was inaugurated 14 December 2016 in the urban park of Castilla-La Mancha in Alcobendas, Madrid. The 3DBUILD technology used was developed by ACCIONA, who was in charge of the structural design, material development and manufacturing of 3D printed elements. The bridge has a total length of 12 metres (39 ft) and a width of 1.75 metres (5.7 ft) and is printed in micro-reinforced concrete. Architectural design was done by Institute of Advanced Architecture of Catalonia (IAAC).

The 3D printer used to build the footbridge was manufactured by D-Shape. The 3D printed bridge reflects the complexities of nature's forms and was developed through parametric design and computational design, which allows to optimize the distribution of materials and allows to maximize the structural performance, being able to place the material only where it is needed, with total freedom of forms. The 3D printed footbridge of Alcobendas represented a milestone for the construction sector at international level, as large scale 3D printing technology has been applied in this project for the first time in the field of civil engineering in a public space.

In 2020, Plaine Commune Grand Paris awarded a consortium led by Freyssinet with Lavigne & Chéron Architectes, Quadric, XtreeE and LafargeHolcim the design–build of a 40-metre (130 ft) pedestrian footbridge in Aubervilliers, whose deck is to be entirely made of 3D‑printed structural concrete, announced for delivery ahead of the 2024 Olympic Games.

=== 3D printed architectural forms ===
In August 2018 in town of Palekh, Russia, was the world's first application of additive technology for 3D-printing new forms for a fountain.

The "Snop" (Sheaf) fountain was originally created in the middle of the 20th century by famous sculptor Nikolai Dydykin. Nowadays, during restoration of the fountain, its shape was changed from a rectangular shape to a round one; with corresponding upgrades to the fountain's backlight system. The renovated fountain now is 26 metres (85 ft) in diameter, and 2.2 metres (7.2 ft) deep. The parapet of the 3D fountain with internal communication channels was printed by the AMT construction printer produced by AMT-SPETSAVIA group.

In 2017, a truss‑like sculptural concrete column for a preschool playground in Aix‑en‑Provence, France, was produced using 3D‑printed formwork, illustrating how additive manufacturing can generate complex voided geometries for cast structural elements.

3D‑printed biomimetic concrete modules have also been deployed to enhance marine habitats. In May 2019, thirty‑two reef units designed by Seaboost with XtreeE and printed using Vicat's concrete ink were submerged off Agde on the Mediterranean coast as part of the Récif'Lab program; earlier prototypes were installed in the Calanques National Park in 2017, and a sculptural unit was immersed in Monaco in October 2021.

=== Extraterrestrial printed structures ===
The printing of buildings has been proposed as a particularly useful technology for constructing off-Earth habitats, such as habitats on the Moon or Mars. As of 2013, the European Space Agency was working with London-based Foster + Partners to examine the potential of printing lunar bases using regular 3D printing technology. The architectural firm proposed a building-construction 3D-printer technology in January 2013 that would use lunar regolith raw materials to produce lunar building structures while using enclosed inflatable habitats for housing the human occupants inside the hardshell printed lunar structures. Overall, these habitats would require only ten percent of the structure mass to be transported from Earth, while using local lunar materials for the other 90 percent of the structure mass. The dome-shaped structures would be a weight-bearing catenary form, with structural support provided by a closed-cell structure, reminiscent of bird bones. In this conception, "printed" lunar soil will provide both "radiation and temperature insulation" for the Lunar occupants. The building technology mixes lunar material with magnesium oxide which will turn the "moonstuff into a pulp that can be sprayed to form the block" when a binding salt is applied that "converts [this] material into a stone-like solid." A type of sulfur concrete is also envisioned.

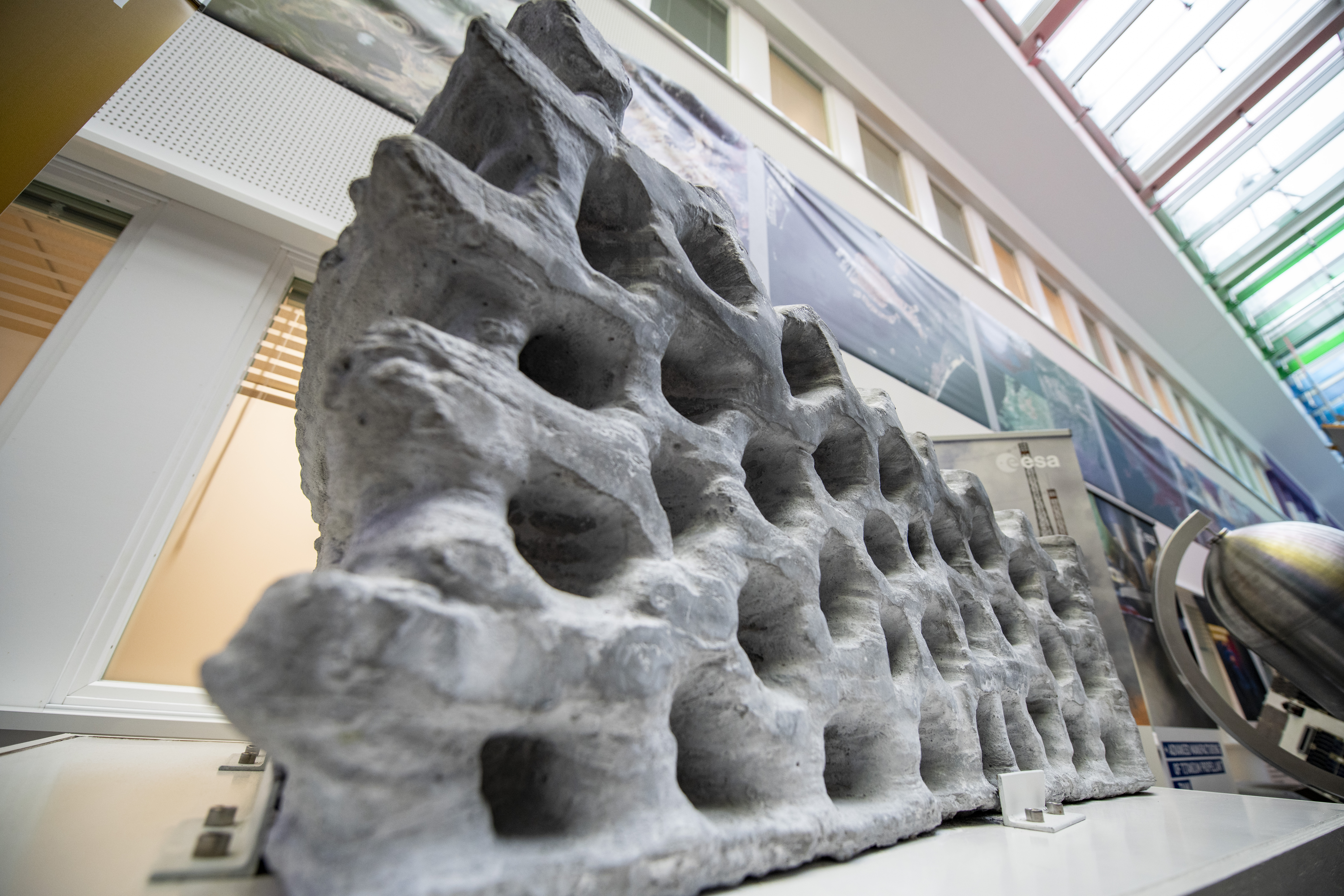
A 1.5 tonne block that was 3D printed from simulated lunar dust, to demonstrate the feasibility of constructing a Moon base using local materials.

Tests of 3D printing of an architectural structure with simulated lunar material have been completed, using a large vacuum chamber in a terrestrial lab. The technique involves injecting the binding liquid under the surface of the regolith with a 3D printer nozzle, which in tests trapped 2 mm (0.079 in) scale droplets under the surface via capillary forces. The printer used was the D-Shape.

A variety of lunar infrastructure elements have been conceived for 3D structural printing, including landing pads, blast protection walls, roads, hangars and fuel storage. In early 2014, NASA funded a small study at the University of Southern California to further develop the Contour Crafting 3D printing technique. Potential applications of this technology include constructing lunar structures of a material that could consist of up to 90% lunar material with only 10% of the material requiring transport from Earth.

NASA is also looking at a different technique that would involve the sintering of lunar dust using low-power (1500-watt) microwave energy. The lunar material would be bound by heating to 1,200 to 1,500 °C (2,200 to 2,700 °F), somewhat below the melting point, in order to fuse the nanoparticle dust into a solid block that is ceramic-like, and would not require the transport of a binder material from Earth as required by the Foster+Partners, Contour Crafting, and D-shape approaches to extraterrestrial building printing. One specific proposed plan for building a lunar base using this technique would be called SinterHab, and would use the JPL six-legged ATHLETE robot to autonomously or telerobotically build lunar structures.

As of December 2022, NASA awarded the Texas based company ICON with a $57.2 million contract to build 3D printed habitats, landing pads, and roads on the lunar surface and to support its ARTEMIS program. The contract runs through 2028. The company participated in the NASA's 3D Printed Habitat Challenge in collaboration with the Colorado School of Mines and was awarded a prize for its printed structural system prototype.

== Clay printing ==
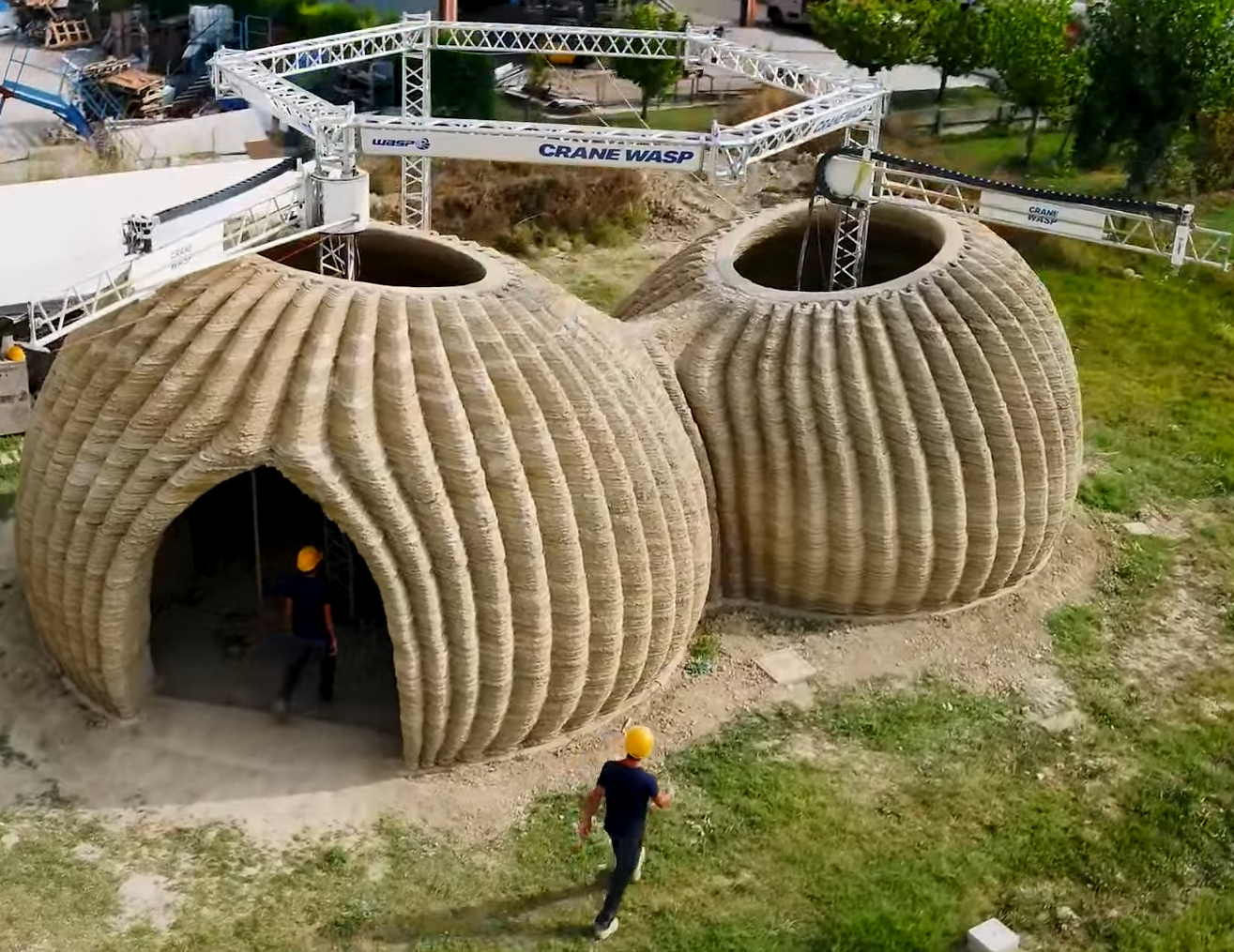
The Tecla as of 2021

Video showing the eco-house and its construction

In April 2021, the first prototype 3D printed house made out of clay, Tecla, was completed. The low-carbon housing was printed by two large synchronized arms from a mixture of locally sourced soil and water as well as fibers from rice husks and a binder. Such buildings could be highly cheap, well-insulated, stable and weatherproof, climate-adaptable, customizable, get produced rapidly, require only very little easily learnable manual labor, mitigate carbon emissions from concrete, require less energy, reduce homelessness, help enable intentional communities such as autonomous, autark eco-communities, and enable the provision of housing for victims of natural disasters as well as – via knowledge- and technology-transfer to local people – for migrants to Europe near their homes, including as an increasingly relevant political option. It was built in Italy by the architecture studio Mario Cucinella Architects and 3D printing specialists WASP. The building's name is a portmanteau of "technology" and "clay".

Data and projections indicate an increasing relevance of buildings that are both low-cost and sustainable, notably that, according to a 2020 UN report, building and construction are responsible for about 38% of all energy-related carbon dioxide emissions, that, partly due to global warming, migration crises are expected to intensify in the future and that the UN estimates that by 2030, 3 billion people or about 40% of the world's population will require access to accessible, affordable housing. Disadvantages of printing with clay-mixtures include height-limitations or horizontal space requirements, initial costs and size of the non-mass-produced printer, latencies due to having to let the mixture dry with current processes, and other problems related to the novelty of the product such as their connection to plumbing systems.

== Concrete printing ==
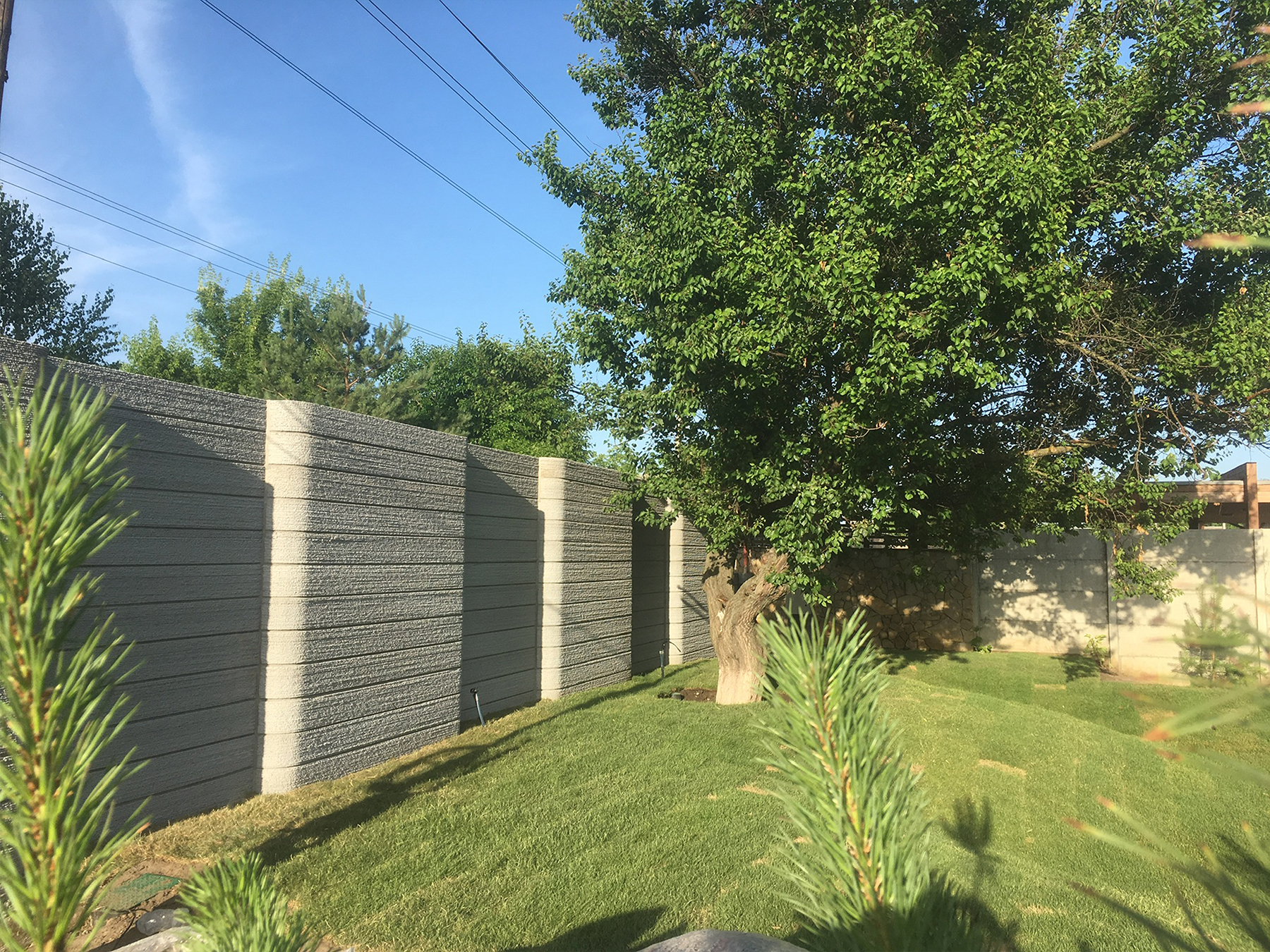
Craft Fence by ConcreteFlow

Large-scale, cement-based 3D printing eliminates the need for conventional molding by precisely placing, or solidifying, specific volumes of material in sequential layers by a computer controlled positioning process. This 3D printing approach consist of three general stages: data preparation, concrete preparation and component printing.

For path and data generation, a variety of methods are implemented for the generation of robotic building paths. A general approach is to slice a 3D shape into flat thin layers with a constant thickness which can be stacked up onto each other. In this method, each layer consists of a contour line and a filling pattern which can be implemented as honeycomb structures or space-filling curves. Another method is the tangential continuity method which produces 3-dimensional building paths with locally varying thicknesses. This method results in creating constant contact surfaces between two layers, therefore, the geometrical gaps between two layers which often limits the 3D printing process will be avoided.

The material preparation stage includes mixing and placing the concrete into the container. Once the fresh concrete has been placed into the container, it can be conveyed through the pump–pipe– nozzle system to print out self-compacting concrete filaments, which can build layer-by-layer structural components. In the additive processes, pumpability and the stability of the extrusion is important for the applications of mortars. These properties will all vary depending on the concrete mix design, the delivery system, and the deposition device. General specifications of wet concrete 3D printing are categorized into four main characteristics:

- Pumpability: The ease and reliability with which material is moved through the delivery system
- Printability: The ease and reliability of depositing material through a deposition device
- Buildability: The resistance of a deposited wet material to deformation under load
- Open time: The period where the above properties are consistent within acceptable tolerances.

To execute the printing process, a control system is required. These systems can be generally split into two categories: gantry systems and robotic arm systems. The gantry system drives a manipulator mounted onto an overhead to locate the print nozzle in XYZ cartesian coordinates while robotic arms offer additional degrees of freedom to the nozzle, allowing more accurate printing workflows such as printing with tangential continuity method. Regardless of the system used for printing (gantry crane or robotic arm), the coordination between the nozzle travel speed and the material flow rate is crucial to the outcome of the printed filament. In some cases, multiple 3D printing robotic arms can be programmed to run simultaneously resulting in decreased construction time. Finally, automated post-processing procedures can also be applied in scenarios which require the removal of support structures or any surface finishing.

The researchers at Purdue University have pioneered a 3D printing process known as Direct-ink-Writing for fabrication of architectured cement-based materials for the first time. They demonstrated using 3D-printing, bio-inspired designs of cement-based materials is feasible and novel performance characteristics such as flaw-tolerance and compliance can be achieved.

== Construction speed ==
As of 2021, the clay-mixture house Tecla can be printed in 200 hours, while the mixture may take weeks to dry.

Claims have been made by Behrokh Khoshnevis since 2006 for 3D printing a house in a day, with further claims to notionally complete the building in approximately 20 hours of "printer" time. By January 2013, working versions of 3D-printing building technology were printing 2 metres (6.6 ft) of building material per hour, with a follow-on generation of printers proposed to be capable of 3.5 metres (11 ft) per hour, sufficient to complete a building in a week.

Demonstrations of robotic 3D concrete printing have reported producing a 2-metre (7 ft) UHPC column in roughly 30 minutes, illustrating high throughput for small prefabricated elements.

The Chinese company WinSun has built several houses using large 3D printers using a mixture of quick drying cement and recycled raw materials. Ten demonstration houses were said by Winsun to have been built in 24 hours, each costing US$5000 (structure not including, footings, services, doors/windows and fitout). However, construction 3D printing pioneer Dr. Behrokh Khoshnevis claims this was faked and that WinSun stole his intellectual property.

== Research and public knowledge ==
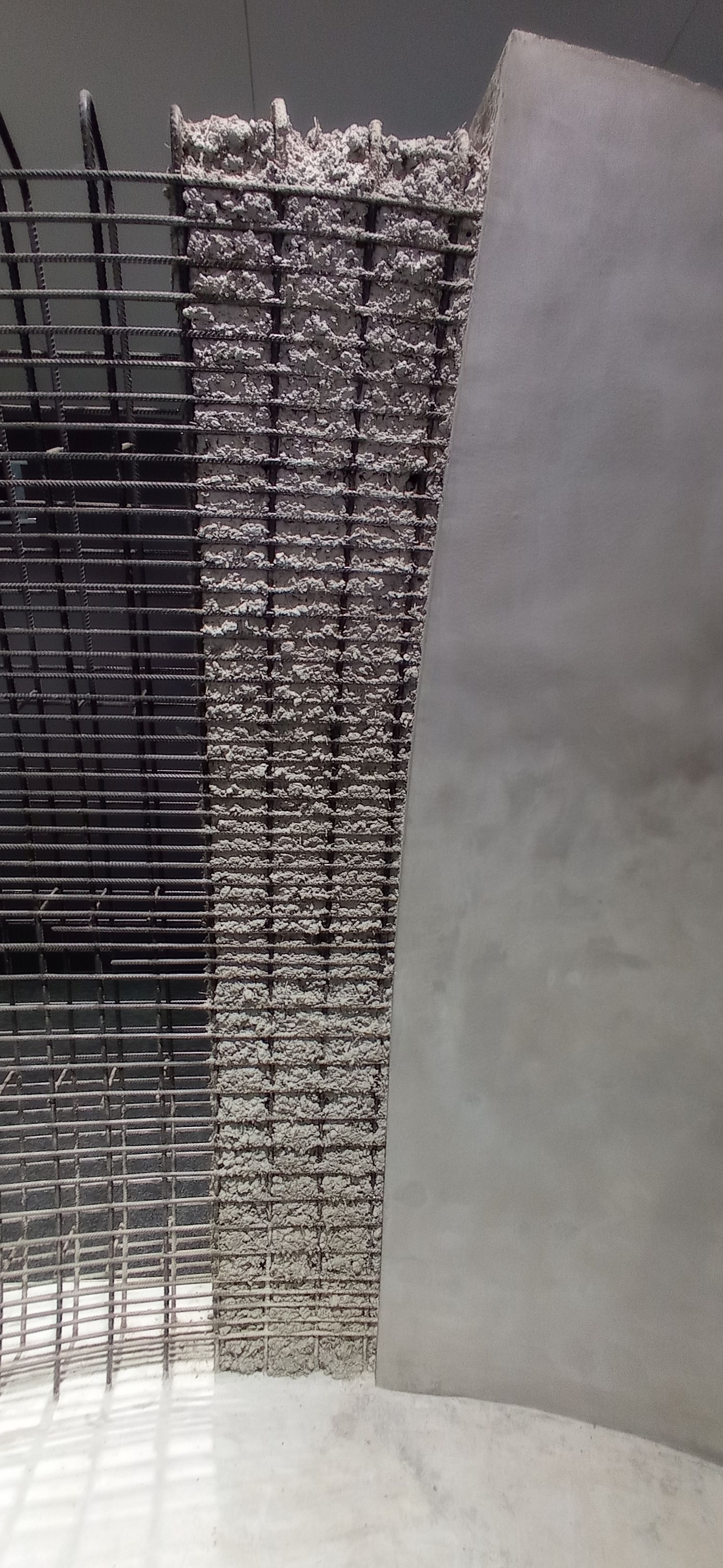
Result of the concrete printing process by a robot, different ways to print continue to be researched.

There are several research projects dealing with 3D construction printing, such as the 3D concrete printing (3DCP) project at the Eindhoven University of Technology, or the various projects at the Institute for Advanced Architecture of Catalonia (Pylos, Mataerial, and Minibuilders). The list of research projects is expanding even more in the last couple of years, thanks to a growing interest in the field.

=== State-of-the-art research ===
The majority of the projects have been focused on researching the physical aspects behind the technology, such as the printing technology, material technology, and the various issues related to them. COBOD International (formerly known as 3DPrinthuset, now its sister company) has recently led a research oriented towards exploring the current state of the technology worldwide, by visiting more than 35 different 3D construction printing related projects. For each project, a research report has been issued, and the gathered data has been used to unify all the various technologies into a first attempt at a common standardized categorization and terminology.

A French research and industrial ecosystem around XtreeE and partner labs has produced several peer‑reviewed contributions documenting materials, processes and structural design for concrete 3D printing. Early work reported a new UHPC processing route and demonstrated feasibility at architectural scale, followed by a widely cited classification of concrete 3D‑printing building systems. Subsequent chapters detailed large‑scale integrated formwork with UHPC and on‑site implementations for pillars and walls, and discussed pathways to industrialisation.

On the structural side, researchers explored space‑truss inspired walls fabricated by robotic mortar extrusion, including free‑deposition printing on EPS supports and pavilion demonstrators, and analysed layer‑pressing strategies and buildability issues.

Process control and rheology were addressed with new inline quality‑control methods. The slugs‑test quantifies yield stress at the nozzle and has since been reused and recommended in international reviews, while broader quality‑assessment frameworks and computer‑vision monitoring were also reported. A 2024 study consolidated online and inline measurements across scales, and a 2025 model quantified the impact of environmental curing on the strength of printed walls, showing losses up to about 30% without proper curing.

=== First 3D construction printing conference ===
Along with the research, 3DPrinthuset (now known as COBOD International) has organized two international conferences on 3D Construction printing (February and November 2017 respectively), aimed bringing companies like D-Shape, Contour Crafting D-Shape, Contour Crafting, CyBe Construction, Eindhoven's 3DCP research, Winsun, and others to talk about possible future issues.

Along the 3D Construction printing specialists, there has also been a strong presence from the traditional construction industry key players for the first time, with names such as Sika AG, Vinci, Royal BAM Group, NCC, MYK LATICRETE, among others.

=== Media interest ===
Although the first steps have been made nearly three decades ago, 3D construction printing has struggled to reach out for years. The first technologies to achieve some media attention were Contour Crafting and D-Shape, with a few sporadic articles in 2008–2012 and a 2012 TV report. D-Shape has also been featured in an independent documentary dedicated to its creator Enrico Dini, called "The man who prints houses".

One important break-through has been seen with the announcement of the first 3D printed building, using a prefabricated 3D printed components made by Winsun, which claimed to be able to print 10 houses in a day with its technology. Although the claims were still to be confirmed, the story has created a wide traction and a growing interest in the field. In a matter of months, many new companies began to emerge. This led to many new endeavors that reached the media, such as, in 2017, the first pedestrian 3D printed bridge and the first cyclist 3D printed bridge, plus an early structural element made with 3D printing in 2016, among many others.

Recently, COBOD International, formerly known as 3DPrinthuset (its sister company) has gained wide media attention with their first permanent 3D printed building, the first of its kind in Europe. The project set an important precedent for being the first 3D printed building with a building permit and documentation in place, and a full approval from the city authorities, a crucial milestone for a wider acceptance in the construction field. The story gained extensive coverage, both on national and international media, appearing on TV in Denmark, Russia, Poland, Lithuania, among many others.

=== 3D printing for remote housing ===
An analysis of 3D printing construction in remote areas as an alternative to conventional construction reveals significant potential. 3D printing in construction offers innovative solutions to the unique challenges of these locations. The ability to use local materials, reduce waste, and adapt to complex and customized designs are just a few of the advantages that make 3D printing particularly suitable for construction in hard-to-reach areas. Additionally, 3D printing can contribute to environmental sustainability and community involvement by enabling active participation in the construction process and maintenance of structures. This construction method has the potential to transform the landscape of remote housing, providing more affordable, efficient, and culturally aligned dwellings for local communities.

However, despite its benefits, there are still various uncertainties and issues to be addressed before 3D printing can be widely adopted. These uncertainties are related to technical, regulatory, economic, and social issues. Despite significant advances in 3D printing technology, its application in housing in remote areas is still in an early stage of feasibility. Research in this field is ongoing and should be further explored, particularly regarding robotics and the materials to be used.

== Sustainability ==
The conventional construction method had higher impacts when compared to the 3D printing method with global warming potential of 1154.20 and 608.55 kg CO_{2} equivalent, non-carcinogenic toxicity 675.10 and 11.9 kg 1,4-DCB, and water consumption 233.35 and 183.95 m^{3}, respectively. The 3D printed house was also found to be an economically viable option, with 78% reduction in the overall capital costs when compared to conventional construction methods. The overall environment impact can be decreased by the use of this technology.

Based on four examples, it has been estimated that the contribution of greenhouse gas emissions per square meter associated with the construction of 3D printed houses is lower than that of conventionally built ones.

== Speed and efficiency ==
Carstensen investigated the influence of 3D printing nozzle size on printing efficiency, focusing on the length of the material print path and the overlap between the paths. The results showed that using a large nozzle size is favorable for continuous short-distance printing when the structure size is large, which can improve both printing efficiency and the structure's performance.

In addition, the study highlights the importance of optimizing the printing speed according to the dynamically monitored structures to ensure the geometric stability of the printed element and the mechanical properties of the 3D printed concrete. This underscores the need to consider the efficiency of concrete 3D printing in relation to the safety and stability of structures, highlighting the complexity and importance of simultaneously optimizing multiple parameters in the concrete 3D printing process.

== See also ==
- Building construction
- Space habitat
- 3D printing
- 3D printing processes
- 3D concrete printing
- Applications of 3D printing
- Made in Space
