= Contour crafting =

Technology for 3D printing of buildings

Contour crafting is a building printing technology being researched by Behrokh Khoshnevis of the University of Southern California's Information Sciences Institute (in the Viterbi School of Engineering) that uses a computer-controlled crane or gantry to build edifices rapidly and efficiently with substantially less manual labor. It was originally conceived as a method to construct molds for industrial parts. Khoshnevis decided to adapt the technology for rapid home construction as a way to rebuild after natural disasters, like the devastating earthquakes that have plagued his native Iran.

Using a quick-setting, concrete-like material, contour crafting forms the house's walls layer by layer until topped off by floors and ceilings set in place by the crane. The notional concept calls for the insertion of structural components, plumbing, wiring, utilities, and even consumer devices like audiovisual systems as the layers are built.

== History ==
Caterpillar Inc. provided funding to help support Viterbi project research in the summer of 2008.

In 2009, Singularity University graduate students established a project with Khoshnevis as the CTO to commercialize Contour Crafting. The project was named "ACASA".

In 2010, Khoshnevis claimed that his system could build a complete home in a single day, and its electrically powered crane would produce very little construction material waste.

Construction of a standard wood-framed house is estimated to create an average of 3-7 tons of waste. Use of contour crafting could significantly reduce environmental impact as it wastes no material at all. In addition, contour crafting does not generate noise, dust or make harmful emissions to the environment given the equipment that is used.

Khoshnevis stated in 2010 that NASA was evaluating Contour Crafting for its application in the construction of bases on Mars and the Moon. After three years, in 2013, NASA funded a small study at the University of Southern California to further develop the Contour Crafting 3D printing technique. Potential applications of this technology include constructing lunar structures of a material that could be built of 90-percent lunar material with only ten percent of the material transported from Earth.

In 2017 the Contour Crafting Corporation (of which Khoshnevis is the CEO) announced a partnership with and investment from Doka Ventures. In the press release, they claim that they "will start delivery of the first printers early next year".

== See also ==
- D-Shape
- 3D printing – Additive process used to make a 3D object
- Broad Sustainable Building – Private manufacturer of central air conditioning
