= Wolf Ranch, Texas =

Community of 3D printed homes in Texas

Coordinates: 30°37′41″N 97°43′10″W

Wolf Ranch is a community of one hundred 3D printed homes in Georgetown, Texas, built by Lennar and ICON. The houses use a proprietary material called Lavacrete, which is more eco-friendly than traditional Portland cement. The floors, walls, and openings (for utilities and windows) in each house are printed completely autonomously. All of the homes are single-level ranch houses. These homes save significant amounts of material and have been proposed as a solution to the ongoing housing crisis in the US. The houses take 4-6 weeks to build, compared to 6-8 months for wood-frame construction. They are resistant to wildfires, hurricanes, earthquakes, tornadoes, and insect invasions. They also provide good thermal insulation, thereby saving energy, especially in the hot climate of Texas.
