= SQ4D =

3D construction printing technology company

- Company type: Private
- Industry: Construction; Construction technology
- Founded: 2017
- Headquarters: New York, United States
- Area served: United States
- Products: Residential buildings
- Services: Construction 3D printing Residential construction

SQ4D is a construction technology company that develops and manufactures construction-scale 3D printing systems. The company's Autonomous Robotic Construction System (ARCS) uses concrete extrusion technology to produce structural components of houses. The company has carried out residential construction projects on Long Island, New York, including homes built and marketed using construction-printing techniques.

== History ==
SQ4D was founded in 2017 as a construction technology venture focused on large-scale construction 3D printing for homes.

In January 2020, the company completed construction of a demonstration residence in Calverton, New York, measuring approximately 1,900 square feet. The project involved 3D printing the structure's foundation and walls using the company's ARCS system over approximately 48 hours of machine operation spread across several days.

The following year, a 3D-printed house built by SQ4D in Riverhead, New York, was listed for sale as a permitted residential building and received attention as one of the early 3D-printed homes to be offered on the residential market in the United States and to be eligible for a certificate of occupancy. The property was built using a combination of 3D-printed concrete components and conventional construction methods for elements such as roofing and mechanical systems.

In 2023, a newly completed home in Islandia, New York, was listed for sale as a 3D-printed residence. The project involved a collaboration between a residential developer and SQ4D and included approximately 2,000 square feet of living space.

=== Collaboration with Habitat for Humanity ===
In 2024, SQ4D participated in a construction project with Habitat for Humanity of Long Island in Brentwood, New York. The project, which was Habitat for Humanity's first 3D-printed home on Long Island, used construction 3D printing for more than half of the structure, including walls, foundation, and insulation.

== Technology ==
SQ4D's construction process uses a track-guided gantry system that extrudes concrete in layers to form structural walls based on a digital building plan. Printed concrete elements are combined with conventional construction methods for roofing, mechanical systems and finishing work.

== See also ==
- Construction 3D printing
- Additive manufacturing
