= 3D Print Canal House =

Architecture project in the Netherlands

Coordinates: 52.3853°N 4.9058°E

The 3D Print Canal House was a three-year, publicly accessible "Research & Design by Doing" project in which an international team of partners from various sectors worked together on 3D printing a canal house in Amsterdam. The house was never built.

By building the house, the partners aimed to research the possibilities of 3D printing architecture and to form connections between design, science, culture, building, software, communities and the city. The project served as both an exhibition of 3D printing technology, as well as a research site into 3D printing architecture. The project was initiated by DUS architects and the site, in Amsterdam North, opened to the public on March 1, 2014.

== Kamermaker ==
The house was to be printed by a fused deposition modeling printer developed by DUS: the Kamermaker ("Room builder"), able to print elements of up to 2.2×2.2×3.5 metres.

== See also ==
- Construction 3D printing
- Fused deposition modeling
- Additive manufacturing
