= Behrokh Khoshnevis =

American engineer

- Born: Behrokh Khoshnevis
- Education: Sharif University of Technology Oklahoma State University
- Occupations: Inventor, CEO and professor at the University of Southern California
- Known for: Inventor of contour crafting
- Website: www.bkhoshnevis.com//

Behrokh Khoshnevis is an American inventor, professor and CEO of Contour Crafting Corporation, a US-based infrastructure and technology company. He is active in CAD/CAM, robotics and mechatronics-related research. His work includes the development of three novel 3D printing processes: contour crafting, SIS, and SSS. Khoshnevis holds more than 100 patents worldwide, including patents in the fields of robotics, automation, fabrication technologies, oil and gas and renewable energy technologies, mechatronics systems for biomedical applications, and tactile sensing devices.

Khoshnevis is a professor of engineering of the University of Southern California, where he sits as director of the Center for Rapid Automated Fabrication Technologies (CRAFT).

== Early life and education ==
Khoshnevis received his BS in industrial engineering in Iran at the Sharif University of Technology in 1974. He received his MS in 1975, and his PhD in industrial engineering and management from Oklahoma State University in 1979. Khoshnevis's educational activities at USC include the teaching of a graduate course in the Invention and Technology Development, and routinely conducting lectures and seminars on the subject of invention. He has supervised 34 Ph.D. theses and 4 post-doctoral researchers at USC.

== Academic posts and memberships ==
- Member of the National Academy of Engineering, elected in 2019 for innovations in manufacturing and construction, including the application of 3D printing methods.
- Fellow of the Society of Manufacturing Engineers, the National Academy of Inventors, the American Society for the Advancement of Science, the Society for Computer Simulation International, the Institute of Industrial & Systems Engineering.
- NASA Innovative Advanced Concept (NIAC) Fellow

== Inventions ==
=== Contour crafting ===
Contour crafting (CC) is a layered fabrication technology used in automated construction of whole structures as well as subcomponents. Using this process, a single house or a colony of houses, with variance in design, may be automatically constructed in a single run, with conduits for electrical, plumbing and air-conditioning embedded within.

=== SIS ===
SIS is an additive manufacturing (AM) technology in which parts are built layer-by-layer from a powder base material. The SIS process involves the prevention of selected areas of powder layers from sintering. SIS may be considered a contrary approach to the Selective Laser Sintering (SLS) process, in which selected areas of powder are sintered by a fine laser beam. SIS takes advantage of bulk sintering in the body of the part, while inhibiting sintering at the part boundaries .

== Awards, achievements and media ==
Khoshnevis's inventions have received coverage in The New York Times, Los Angeles Times, Business Week, Der Spiegel, New Scientist, receiving both US and international radio and television coverage.

Contour crafting was selected as one of the top 25 out of more than 4,000 candidate inventions by the History Channel program Modern Marvels and the National Inventor's Hall of Fame; and has been identified as one of the major disruptive technologies of the modern era. Contour crafting has been exhibited at numerous museums worldwide.

In 2014, Khoshnevis was selected as the recipient of the Grand Prize of the Creating the Future design contest, for invention of contour crafting robotic construction technology. The program was organized by NASA Tech Briefs Media Group, and sponsored by major industry leaders, including Intel and HP. The Grand Prize was given to one of more than 1000 globally competing technologies.

In 2016, Khoshnevis won a NASA international top prize for the In-Situ Challenge, a competition to build proposed structures on the Moon and Mars out of local planetary materials. Khoshnevis's proposal involved using his SSS technology for autonomous construction of landing pads and roads, as well as fabrication of interlocking bricks and other objects such as metallic tools and spare parts using in-situ materials.

In 2012, he featured in a TEDx presentation on automated construction with over 1.3 million views. His talk was later ranked by TED as a top five among more than 30,000 TEDx talks.

In 2017, Khoshnevis was recognized by Connected World Magazine as a top 10 academic pioneer of IOT technologies.

In 2018, he received the Pioneering award during the first RILEM digital concrete conference for its outstanding contribution to the field of concrete digital fabrication.
