= Development Fund of the Swedish Construction Industry =

Svenska Byggbranchens Utvecklingsfond
- Headquarters: Stockholm, Sweden
- Key people: Ruben Aronsson, CEO
- Website: www.sbuf.se

Employers and employees founded the Development Fund of the Swedish Construction Industry (Swedish: Svenska Byggbranschens Utvecklingsfond, SBUF) jointly in 1983. SBUF is the construction industry's organisation for research and development with approximately 5,000 affiliated companies in Sweden. SBUF aims to promote development in the building process to create more businesslike conditions for contractors enabling them to make use of research and conduct development work.

== Aims and goals ==
SBUF aims to promote development in the building process to create more businesslike conditions for contractors enabling them to make use of research and conduct development work.

SBUF operates with a board, four committees and a secretariat. SBUF members are represented on the board and the committees. One or more committees (building, civil engineering, mechanical services) are screening the applications and makes suggestions about grants for development projects before the board makes the decision. The research committee handles applications for university research in co-operation with the companies. About 100 projects are being granted yearly.

Further aims are

- to improve the effectiveness ranging from raw material to complete product and from idea to destruction by means of development and collaboration,
- to promote collaboration for development with specialised contractors in order to improve the effectiveness in the entire building sector,
- to stimulate and support research at the technical universities on questions vital to contractors and,
- to support development of methods and equipment making construction, service and maintenance more attractive and better adjusted to construction workers,
- to support research and development being the basis for performance-oriented public rules and standards

SBUF spends about 50 million SEK yearly on support for development and research projects. However, the companies running the projects finance part of the projects. Projects are co-financed with government support, mostly from the Swedish Research Council for Environment, Agricultural Sciences and Spatial Planning (Formas) but also from the Swedish Agency for Innovation Systems (Vinnova), the Swedish Transport Administration (Trafikverket) and other research organisations. SBUF contributes to several major research programmes founded on co-operation between companies and technical universities.

== See also ==
- Economy of Sweden
