= Performative architecture =

Performative architecture is a contemporary system of architecture that utilizes performance-based principles to design buildings and spaces.

== Emergence of a new philosophical approach ==
Building performance as a guiding design principle is an emerging approach to architecture. In performative architecture, buildings are no longer viewed as objects that simply result from design and construction techniques and which represent various practices and ideas.

This new type of architecture utilizes quantitative and qualitative digital simulations to determine an approach to a built environment.

== Computing the performative ==
Technology such as the advances in computer programs opens up possibilities to the emergence of performative-based design. Advances in digital technology programs, enable new performative structures and open up new possibilities in being able to see the structure in 3D on the computers before construction. Emphasis is shifted to the processes of form generation, based on performative strategies of design such as structure, acoustics or environment design.

Technology has opened up new possibilities for designers to assess certain performance aspects of their designs. Architects and engineers are working in collaboration to create new performative-based structures.

== Movement and Performance ==
Architecture can be given performative capacity through the movement of people around and through a building. The experience of a structure's spatial presence and materiality along with the engagement of the eye and the body are some of what makes architecture performative.

The creation of architecture of spectacle and performance comes through the movement of the object/building itself rather than from the subject. An example of such a building is the Millennium Bridge in Gateshead, UK, the world's first rotating bridge. The entire bridge rotates around and pivots on both sides of the river so that its tilt creates sufficient clearance for the ships to pass underneath.

The idea that the mechanics of a building can create action, with some parts of the building literally being able to move, such as screens, apertures, and furnishings. This movement may be mechanical or manual and initiated by human or environmental prompts. An illustration of this aspect of architectural performance is Renzo Piano's Aurora Place in Sydney, Australia (1996–2000), its exterior surfaces and elements consist of moving and moveable mechanisms.

Performative architecture is still being developed and its ideas formed as a concrete definition, the term being widely used but rarely linked back to being defined as performance architecture.

== See also ==
- Architecture
- Interior design
- Performing arts
