= D-Shape =

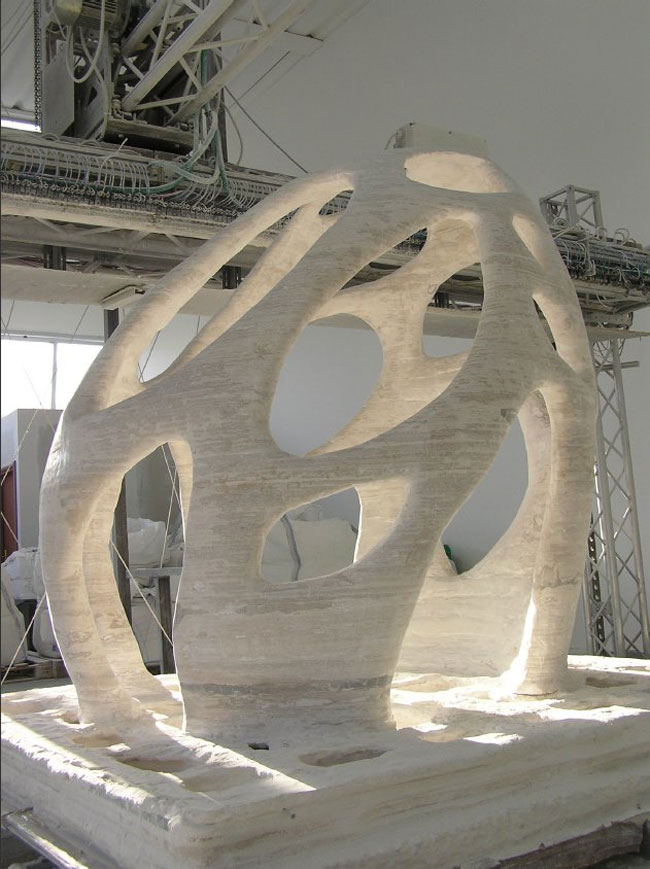
A demonstration of a sample print, printed by the D-Shape 3D printer

D-Shape is a large 3-dimensional printer that uses a binder-jetting, a layer-by-layer printing process to bind sand with inorganic seawater and magnesium-based binder to create stone-like objects. Invented by Enrico Dini, founder of Monolite UK Ltd, the first model of the D-Shape printer used epoxy resin—commonly used as an adhesive in the construction of skis, cars, and airplanes, as a binder. Dini patented this model in 2006. After experiencing problems with the epoxy, Dini changed the binder to the current magnesium-based one and patented the printer again in September 2008. Currently, D-Shape is developing two new printer models featuring increased output capacity and enhanced automation through integrated robotics. The latest version of the printer utilizes cementitious, sustainable, and environmentally friendly materials, which not only reduce carbon emissions but also help counteract sea acidification, contributing to healthier marine ecosystems.

== Technical description ==
The first model of the D-Shape 3D printer was built within a 6 m by 6 m aluminum frame. The frame consists of a square base that moves upwards along four vertical beams during the printing process. Stepper motors on each beam control this movement, allowing precise positioning and holding at specific heights. A printer head, spanning the full 6-meter horizontal length of the base, contains 300 nozzles spaced 20 millimeters apart. An aluminum beam runs perpendicular to the printer head, connecting it to the base.

== Process ==
Before printing, a 3D model of the object must be created using CAD software, which allows designers to construct detailed 3D models digitally. Once finalized, the CAD file is sent to the printer for processing. The printing process begins when a layer of sand—typically 5 to 10 mm thick—is evenly distributed across the build area by a mechanical spreader. In the latest versions of the printer, the admixture can vary and may include cementitious materials blended with sustainable aggregates such as pozzolanic compounds, reducing the carbon footprint by over 60%. The 3D printing software slices the model into 2D layers. Starting from the bottom slice, the printer head moves across the surface and selectively deposits an inorganic binding solution. While earlier models used a magnesium chloride solution, newer versions can also utilize standard potable water as the binder, depending on the material mix and application requirements. This binder reacts chemically with the sand and magnesium oxide (MgO) to form a stone-like material resembling Sorel cement. Full solidification typically occurs within 24 hours.

An electric piston moves the printer head perpendicular to its primary motion to fill gaps and ensure uniform binder application. D-Shape completes each layer with four forward and backward strokes. After each layer is printed, stepper motors on the vertical beams raise the base incrementally to prepare for the next layer. Sand is replenished cyclically via the hollow framework above the build area, which distributes fresh material into the frame for spreading by the mechanical spreader. During the printing process, excess sand acts as a support for the solidifying structure and can be recovered and reused in subsequent printings. The process continues layer by layer until the full structure is completed. After printing is complete, the final structure must be excavated from the surrounding sand. In earlier models, workers typically used shovels or other manual tools to remove the excess sand and reveal the finished product. In upgraded versions of the printer, an automated depowdering system has been installed, making the process significantly safer and faster by reducing manual labor and exposure to airborne particles.

During the printing process, the magnesium oxide in the sand chemically reacts with the binder—whether magnesium chloride or potable water in newer models—to form a microcrystalline, mineral-like material. Unlike conventional concrete, which has low tensile strength and requires iron reinforcement, D-Shape's printed structures exhibit relatively high tension resistance and do not require additional reinforcement. The construction process is reported to take approximately one-quarter of the time and cost between one-third to one-half of building the same structure using traditional methods and Portland cement, the standard material in conventional construction.

== Marine Applications ==
D-Shape is at the forefront of nature-inclusive marine construction, enabling the fabrication of artificial reefs, coastal protection modules, and biodiversity-enhancing habitats.

- Over 500 installations worldwide
- Structures designed for high bio-attractivity
- Supports reef restoration, fish spawning, and shoreline defense
- Vitareef Division: Empowers communities and researchers to print marine habitats locally

== Global Presence ==
Headquartered in Hong Kong at the Science and Technology Park (HKSTP), with operations across Europe and Asia, D-Shape is strategically positioned to support global sustainability efforts through advanced 3D printing technologies and eco-conscious marine infrastructure solutions.

- Collaborations with ESA, MIT, TU Delft, and Scuola Superiore S. Anna
- Projects with Hong Kong Airport Authority, Arup, and Foster + Partners
- Winner of the NYC Waterfront Construction Competition, saving the city an estimated $2.9 billion

== Awards and achievements ==
=== NYC Waterfront Construction Competition ===
In the fall of 2012, D-Shape entered into the NYC Waterfront Construction Competition hosted by the New York City Economic Development Corporation (NYCEDC) in which competitors had to create a solution to help strengthen New York City's deteriorating piers and coastline structures. D-Shape's idea called, "Digital Concrete," was to take 3-D scans of each piece of pier or infrastructure and then print a support jacket for each specific piece. D-Shape won first place and received $50,000 for the idea, and estimated that it could save New York City up to $2.9 billion.

=== Radiolaria ===
In 2009, D-Shape printed a large 3-D sculpture, Radiolaria. The sculpture was created by Italian architect Andrea Morgante and inspired by radiolarians, unicellular organisms with intricate mineral skeletons. The original version of the sculpture was a 3 x 3 x 3 m scale model of the full-size Radiolaria that was planned to be put in a roundabout in Pontedera, Italy.

=== Recognition and Impact in Marine Sustainability ===
D-Shape received the Hong Kong Global Design Award and the DFA Design for Asia Award in 2022, recognizing its innovative approach to sustainable marine infrastructure and advanced 3D printing technology.

One of its notable achievements includes a successful project delivered for the Airport Authority Hong Kong, where D-Shape's artificial reef structures were deployed in challenging marine conditions. The project has since been scaled up, demonstrating measurable success in enhancing marine biodiversity and mitigating human-induced environmental damage. The reef modules have proven resilient in harsh coastal environments, supporting ecological restoration and sustainable fisheries management.

=== 2025-2026 - International Recognition for Marine Habitat Restoration ===
D-Shape's large-scale 3D printing technology was showcased through Nereid, a marine habitat restoration project developed in collaboration with Zaha Hadid Architects (ZHA), the Hong Kong Science and Technology Parks Corporation (HKSTP), and Professor James Fang of The Hong Kong Polytechnic University. Designed for deployment within Hong Kong's North Lantau Marine Park, the project applies additive manufacturing to create artificial reef structures that support marine biodiversity, ecosystem regeneration, and coastal resilience. Nereid was presented at the World Design Congress 2025 as part of the "Design for Planet" programme and was subsequently exhibited at the London Creates Exhibition 2026, highlighting the role of advanced 3D printing technologies in environmental restoration and sustainable marine infrastructure.

== Recent Developments ==
Currently, Jake Wake-Walker and Marc Webb are working on a documentary titled The Man Who Prints Houses, about Enrico Dini and his invention.

D-Shape is still in development. It has printed a trullo, but the printer is unable to print larger structures.

== Space Exploration ==
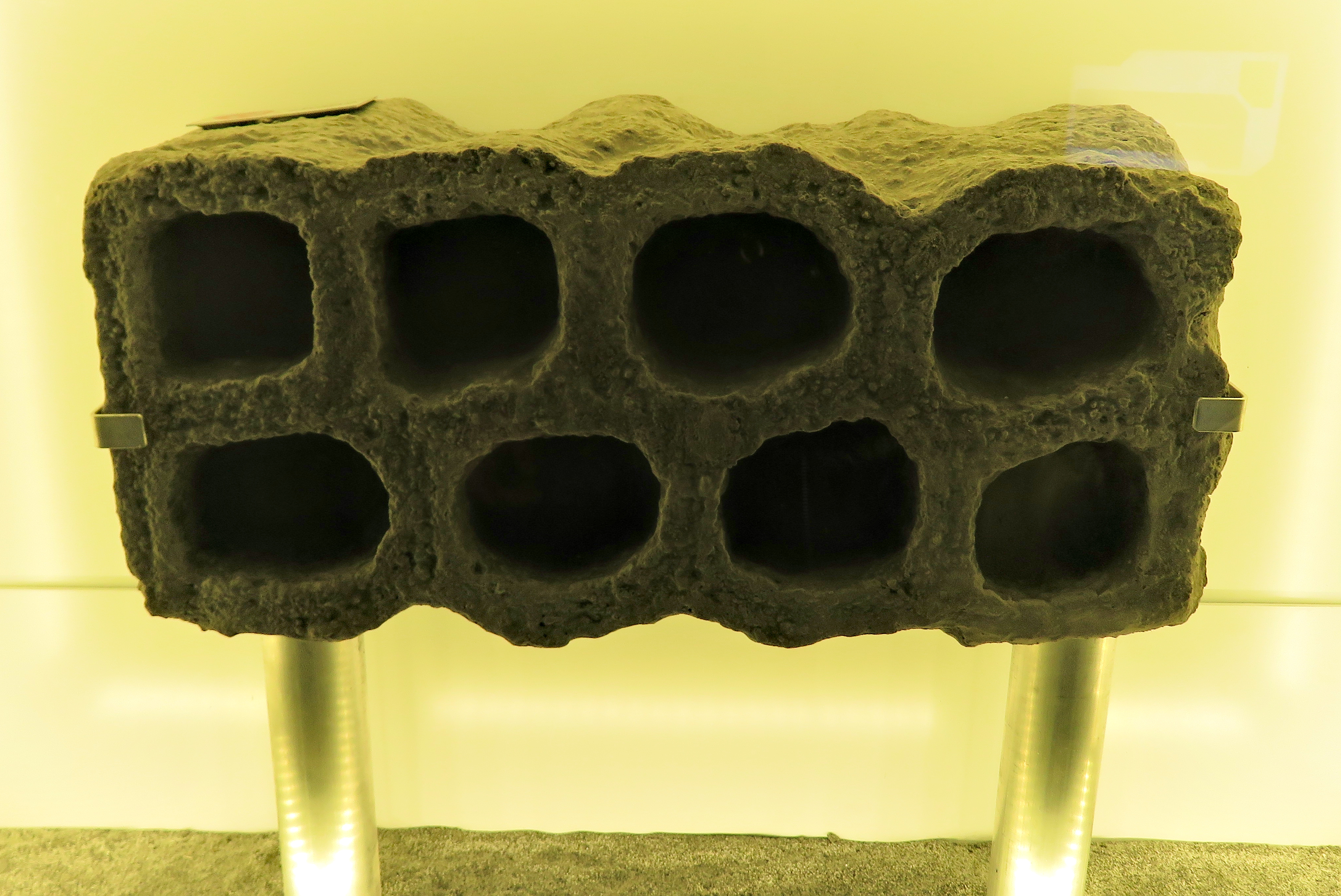
Brick made of agglomerated dust similar to lunar regolith, made for ESA by the Italian company D-Shape. Such bricks could cover a European permanent Moon base to protect it from radiations and meteorites. On display at Cité des sciences et de l'industrie, Paris, France and at Museum of the Future, Dubai, UAE.

Because of D-Shape's capabilities, the European Space Agency (ESA) has taken interest in using the printer to build Moon bases using lunar regolith. D-Shape has been successful in printing components for the lunar bases with a simulated regolith and has tested to see how the printer will work in the environment on the Moon.

== Legacy & Vision ==
Founded to honor the legacy of Italian engineering legends Corradino D’Ascanio and Egisto Dini, D-Shape continues to push the boundaries of 3D printing. Its mission is to restore coastlines, advance sustainable construction, and make ecological solutions accessible to all.
