= Military robot =

Robotic devices designed for military applications

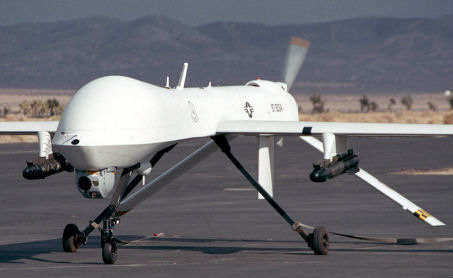
Armed RQ-1 Predator drone

Military robots are autonomous robots or remote-controlled mobile robots designed for military applications, from transport to search & rescue and attack.

Some such systems are currently in use, and many are under development. The difference between military robots and military drones is unclear as of 2025: some say that lethal autonomous weapons are robots whereas others describe “fully autonomous military drones”.

== History ==
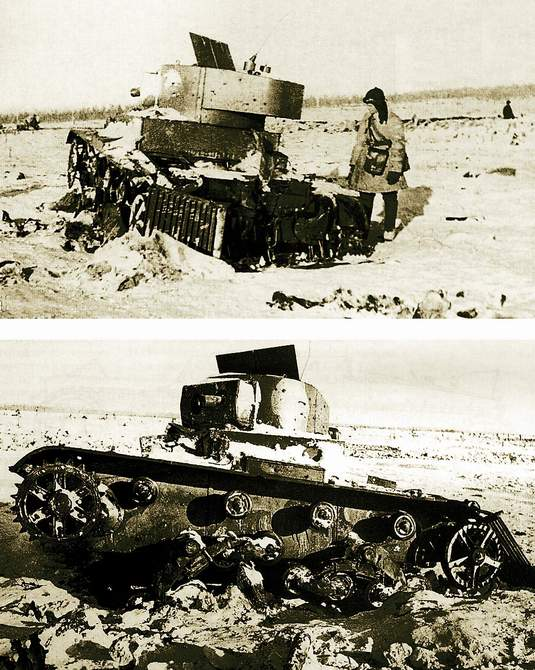
Soviet TT-26 teletank, February 1940

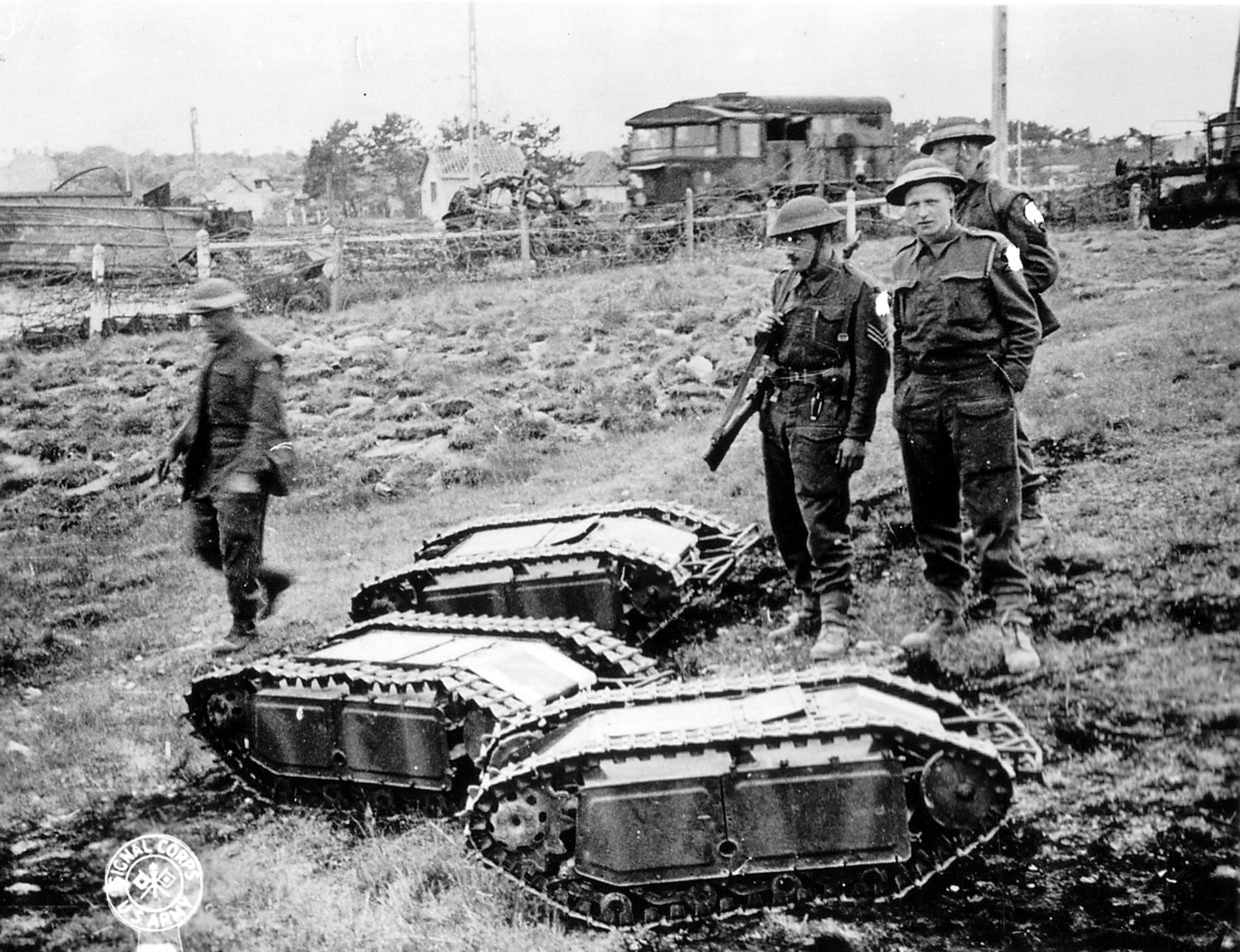
British soldiers with captured German Goliath remote-controlled demolition vehicles (Battle of Normandy, 1944)

Broadly defined, military robots date back to World War II and the Cold War in the form of the German Goliath tracked mines and the Soviet teletanks. The introduction of the MQ-1 Predator drone was when "CIA officers began to see the first practical returns on their decade-old fantasy of using aerial robots to collect intelligence".

The use of robots in warfare, although traditionally a topic for science fiction, is being researched as a possible future means of fighting wars. Already several military robots have been developed by various armies. Some believe the future of modern warfare will be fought by automated weapons systems. The U.S. military is investing heavily in the RQ-1 Predator, which can be armed with air-to-ground missiles and remotely operated from a command center in reconnaissance roles. DARPA has hosted competitions in 2004 & 2005 to involve private companies and universities to develop unmanned ground vehicles to navigate through rough terrain in the Mojave Desert for a final prize of 2 million.

Artillery has seen promising research with an experimental weapons system named "Dragon Fire II" which automates loading and ballistics calculations required for accurate predicted fire, providing a 12-second response time to fire support requests. However, military weapons are prevented from being fully autonomous; they require human input at certain intervention points to ensure that targets are not within restricted fire areas as defined by Geneva Conventions for the laws of war.

There have been some developments towards developing autonomous fighter jets and bombers. The use of autonomous fighters and bombers to destroy enemy targets is especially promising because of the lack of training required for robotic pilots, autonomous planes are capable of performing maneuvers which could not otherwise be done with human pilots (due to high amount of G-force), plane designs do not require a life support system, and a loss of a plane does not mean a loss of a pilot. However, the largest drawback to robotics is their inability to accommodate for non-standard conditions. Advances in artificial intelligence in the near future may help to rectify this.

In 2020 a Kargu 2 drone hunted down and attacked a human target in Libya, according to a report from the UN Security Council’s Panel of Experts on Libya, published in March 2021. This may have been the first time an autonomous killer robot armed with lethal weaponry attacked human beings.

In April 2026 Ukrainian president Volodymyr Zelenskyy claimed that Ukraine took a Russian position during the ongoing Russo-Ukrainian war using only drones and ground robots and no Infantry units in what he said was a first for the war, and that robots had done 22,000 missions over the previous three months.

== Examples ==
=== In current use ===
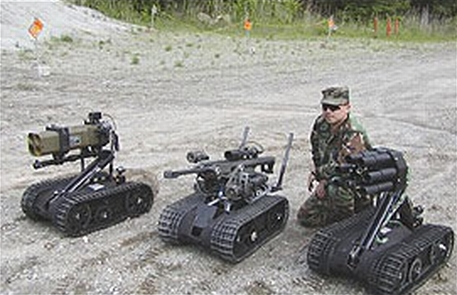
Foster-Miller TALON SWORDS units equipped with various weaponry

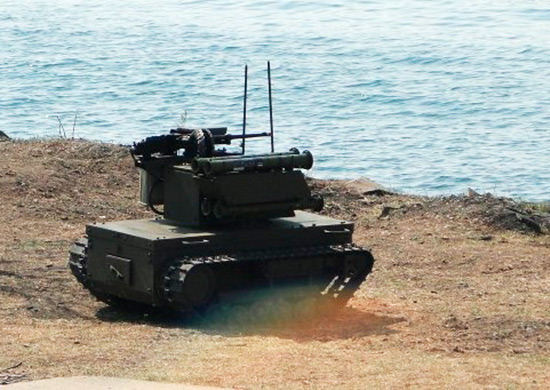
The Platforma-M variant of the Multifunctional Utility/Combat support/Patrol. Serially produced by the Russian Army.

- Robot wolf, China
- D9T Panda, Israel
- Elbit Hermes 450, Israel
- Goalkeeper CIWS
- Guardium
- IAIO Fotros, Iran
- PackBot
- MQ-9 Reaper
- MQ-1 Predator
- TALON
- Samsung SGR-A1
- Shahed 129, Iran
- Baykar Bayraktar TB2, Turkey
- Albatross, Taiwan
- Shomer Gvouloth ("Border Keeper"), Israel
- THeMIS, Estonia
- The Sharp Claw and The Mule 200, deployed by the Chinese People's Liberation Army on the China-India border
- ARCV robotic mule, deployed by the Indian Army on the India-China border

=== In development ===
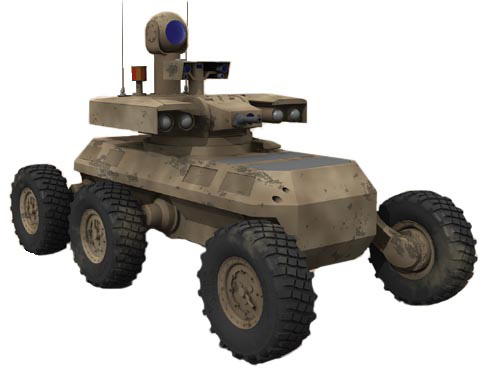
The armed robotic vehicle variant of the MULE

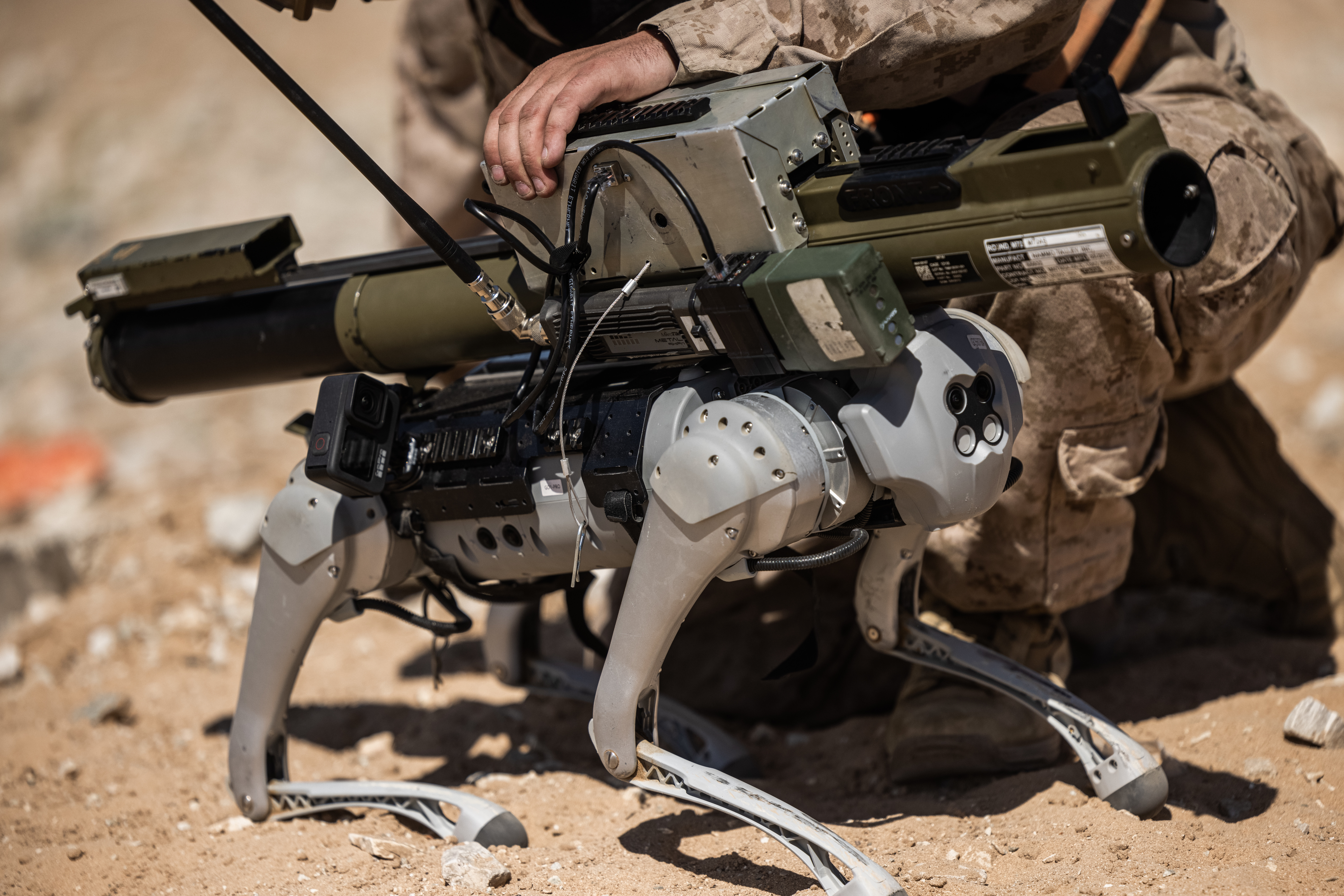
U.S. Marines test fire the M72 LAW mounted on a Unitree robot dog

- MIDARS, a four-wheeled robot outfitted with several cameras, radar, and possibly a firearm, that automatically performs random or preprogrammed patrols around a military base or other government installation. It alerts a human overseer when it detects movement in unauthorized areas, or other programmed conditions. The operator can then instruct the robot to ignore the event, or take over remote control to deal with an intruder, or to get better camera views of an emergency. The robot would also regularly scan radio frequency identification tags (RFID) placed on stored inventory as it passed and report any missing items.
- Tactical Autonomous Combatant (TAC) units, described in Project Alpha study Unmanned Effects: Taking the Human out of the Loop.
- Autonomous Rotorcraft Sniper System is an experimental robotic weapons system being developed by the U.S. Army since 2005. It consists of a remotely operated sniper rifle attached to an unmanned autonomous helicopter. It is intended for use in urban combat or for several other missions requiring snipers. Flight tests are scheduled to begin in summer 2009.
- The "Mobile Autonomous Robot Software" research program was started in December 2003 by the Pentagon who purchased 15 Segways in an attempt to develop more advanced military robots. The program was part of a $26 million Pentagon program to develop software for autonomous systems.
- ACER
- Atlas (robot)
- Battlefield Extraction-Assist Robot
- Dassault nEUROn (French UCAV)
- Dragon Runner
- MATILDA
- MULE (US UGV)
- R-Gator
- Ripsaw MS1
- SUGV
- Syrano
- iRobot Warrior
- PETMAN
- Excalibur unmanned aerial vehicle
- Teng Yun medium size reconnaissance UAV program, Taiwan
- BDLTech War-V2
- BDLTech War-V1

== Effects and impact ==
=== Advantages ===
Autonomous robotics reduce casualties by removing serving soldiers, who might otherwise be killed, from the lethality. The decrease in human casualties can contribute to a de-escalatory effect. Lt. Gen. Richard Lynch of the United States Army Installation Management Command and assistant Army chief of staff for installation stated at a 2011 conference:

As I think about what’s happening on the battlefield today ... I contend there are things we could do to improve the survivability of our service members. And you all know that’s true.

Major Kenneth Rose of the US Army's Training and Doctrine Command outlined some of the advantages of robotic technology in warfare:

Machines don't get tired. They don't close their eyes. They don't hide under trees when it rains and they don't talk to their friends ... A human's attention to detail on guard duty drops dramatically in the first 30 minutes ... Machines know no fear.

Increasing attention is also paid to how to make the robots more autonomous, with a view of eventually allowing them to operate on their own for extended periods of time, possibly behind enemy lines. For such functions, systems like the Energetically Autonomous Tactical Robot are being tried, which is intended to gain its own energy by foraging for plant matter. The majority of military robots are tele-operated; they are used for reconnaissance, surveillance, sniper detection, neutralizing explosive devices, etc. Tele-operated robots are not taking lives autonomously. Advantages regarding the lack of emotion and passion in robotic combat is also taken into consideration as a beneficial factor in significantly reducing instances of unethical behavior in wartime. Autonomous machines are created not to be "truly 'ethical' robots", yet ones that comply with the laws of war (LOW) and rules of engagement (ROE). Hence the fatigue, stress, emotion, adrenaline, etc. that affect a human soldier's rash decisions are removed; there will be no effect on the battlefield caused by the decisions made by the individual.

=== Risks ===
Human rights groups and NGOs such as Human Rights Watch and the Campaign to Stop Killer Robots have started urging governments and the United Nations to issue policy to outlaw the development of so-called "lethal autonomous weapons systems" (LAWS). The United Kingdom opposed such campaigns, with the Foreign Office declaring that "international humanitarian law already provides sufficient regulation for this area".

In July 2015, over 1,000 experts in artificial intelligence signed a letter calling for a ban on autonomous weapons. The letter was presented in Buenos Aires at the 24th International Joint Conference on Artificial Intelligence (IJCAI-15) and was co-signed by Stephen Hawking, Elon Musk, Steve Wozniak, Noam Chomsky, Skype co-founder Jaan Tallinn and Google DeepMind co-founder Demis Hassabis, among others.

=== Psychology ===
American soldiers have been known to name the robots that serve alongside them. These names are often in honor of human friends, family, celebrities, pets, or are eponymic. The 'gender' assigned to the robot may be related to the marital status of its operator.

Some affixed fictitious medals to battle-hardened robots, and even held funerals for destroyed robots. An interview of 23 explosive ordnance detection members shows that while they feel it is better to lose a robot than a human, they also felt anger and a sense of loss if they were destroyed. A survey of 746 people in the military showed that 80% either 'liked' or 'loved' their military robots, with more affection being shown towards ground rather than aerial robots. Surviving dangerous combat situations together increased the level of bonding between soldier and robot, and current and future advances in artificial intelligence may further intensify the bond with the military robots.

== Pictures ==
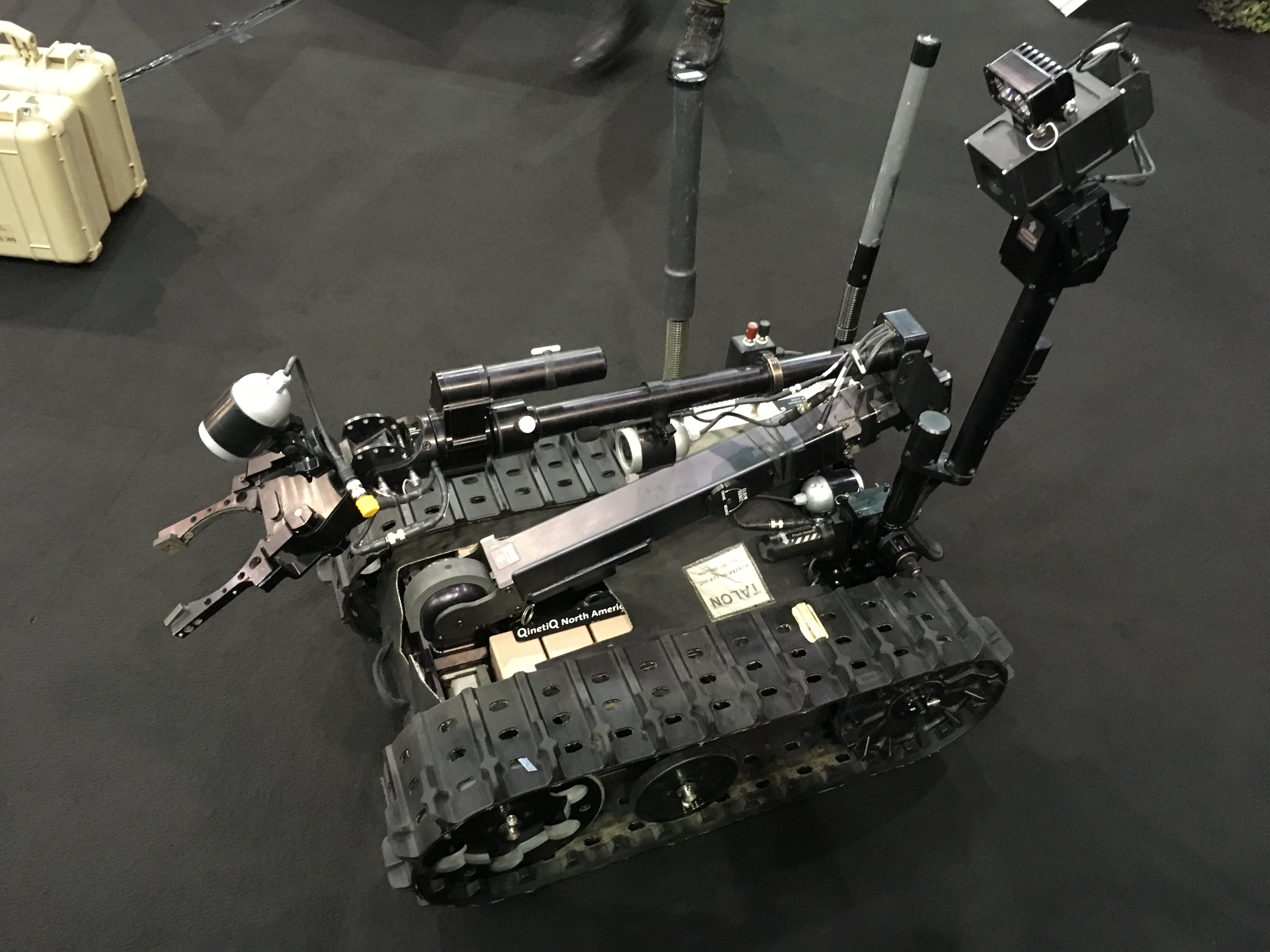
UGV TALON Gen. IV (USA)

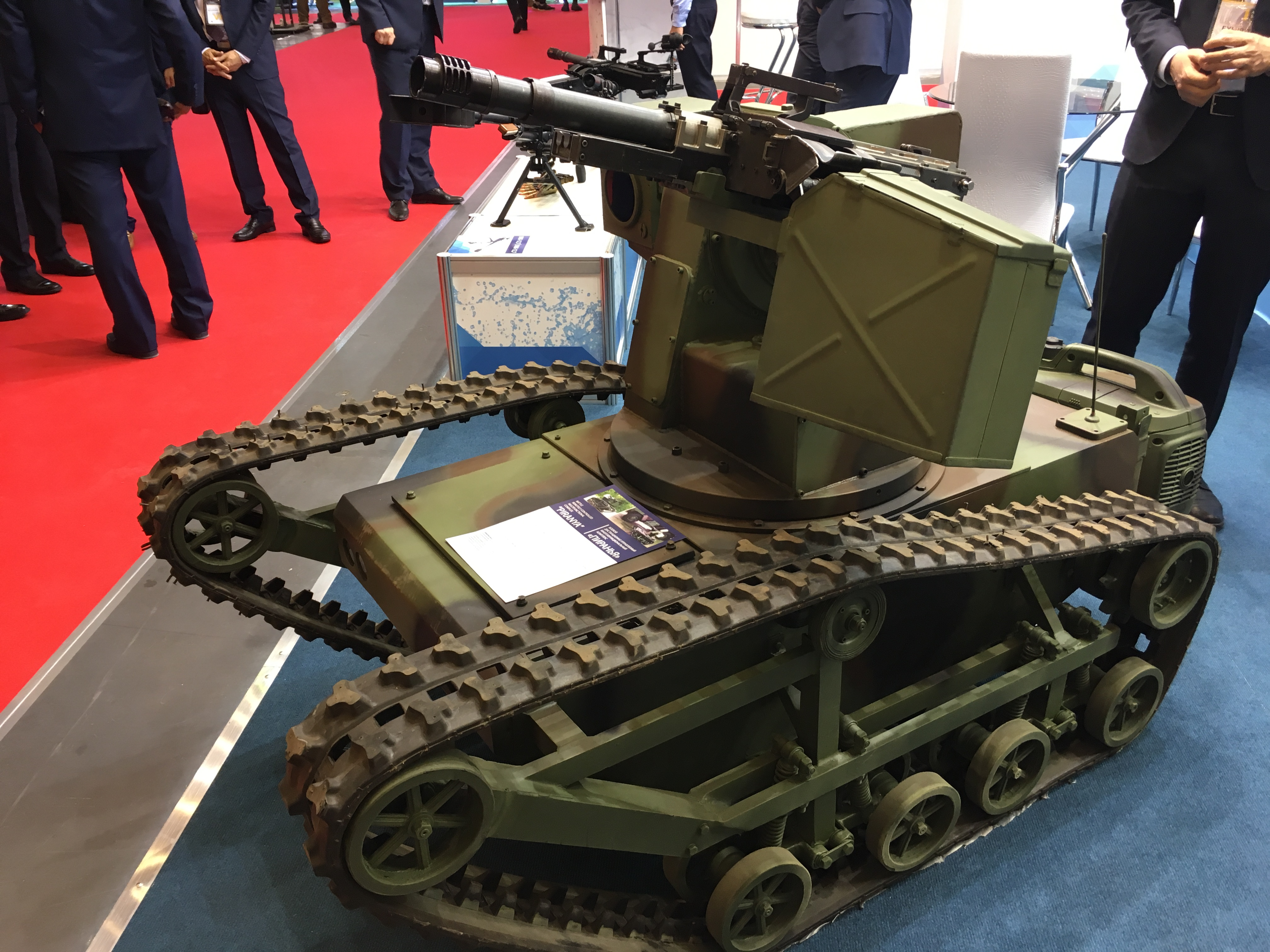
UGV "PIRANYA" (Ukraine)

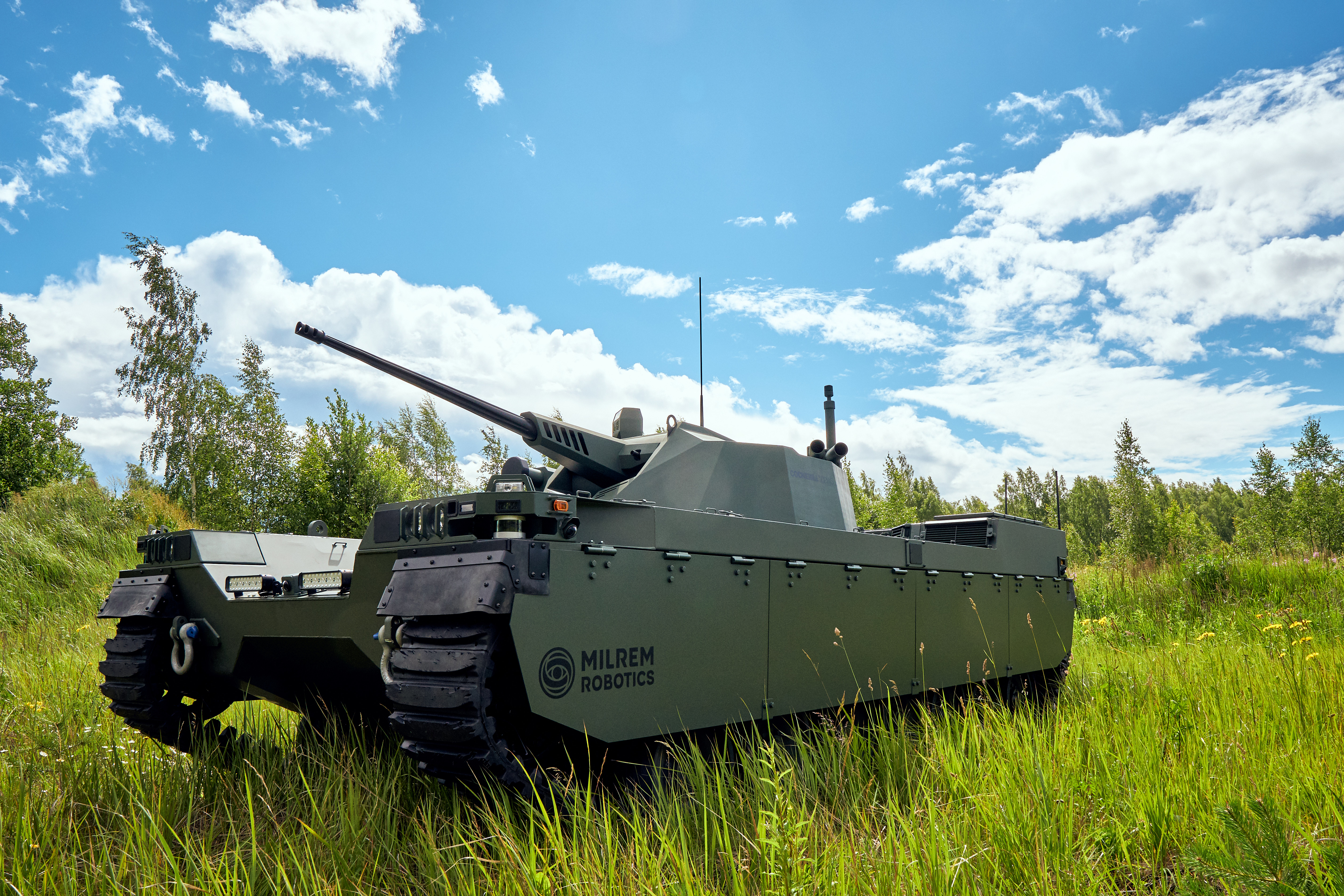
Type-X (Estonia)

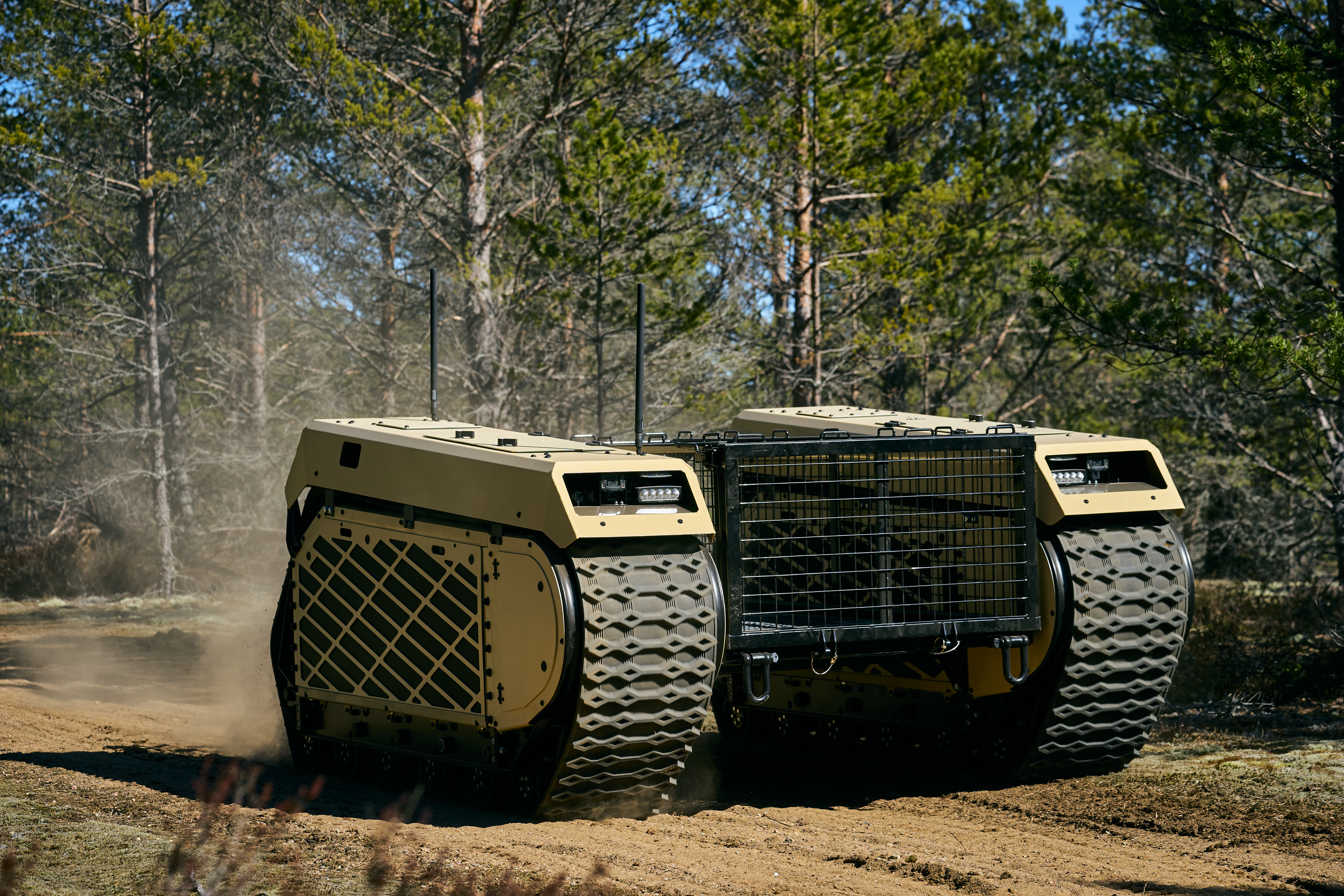
THeMIS (Estonia)

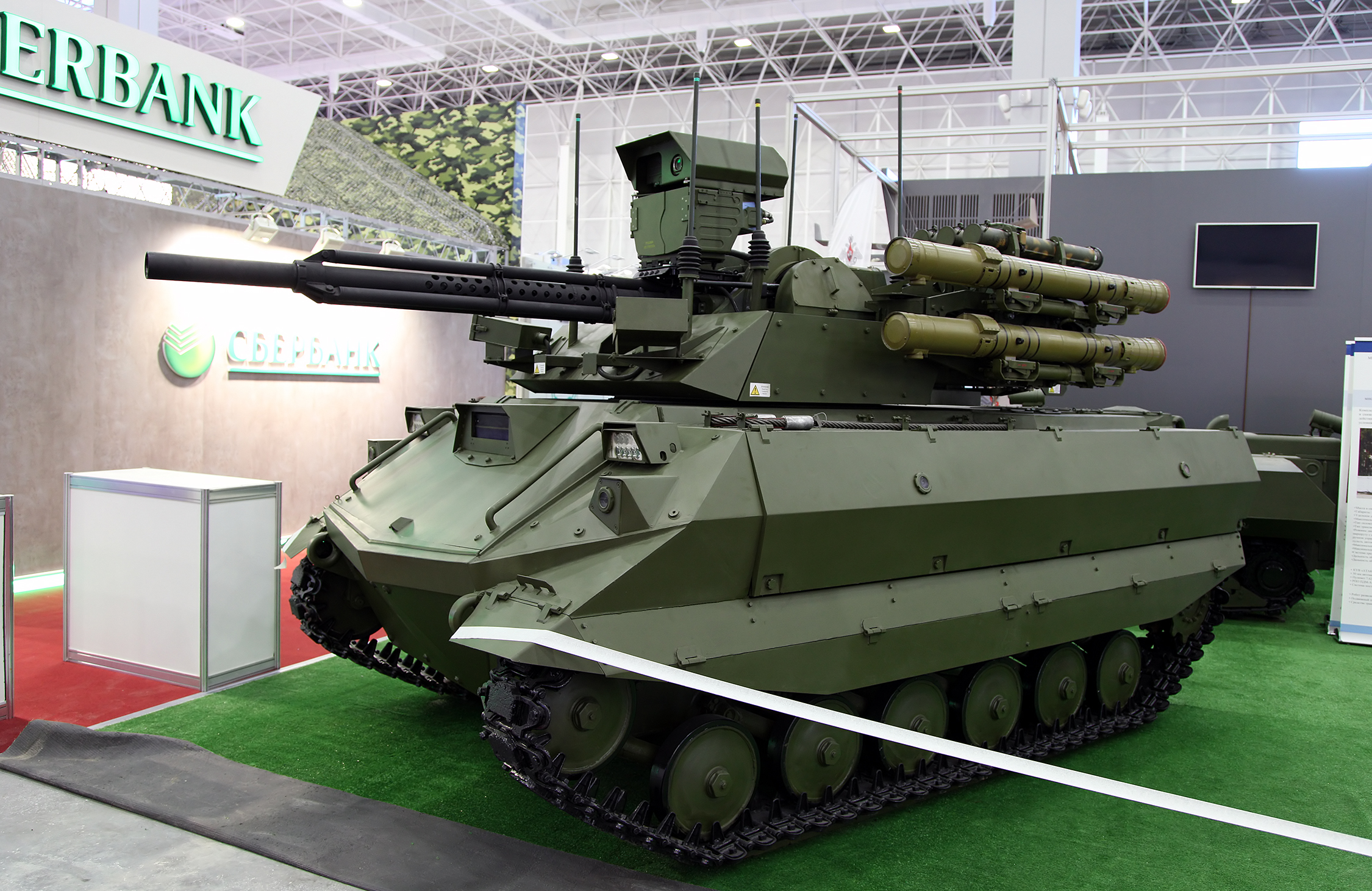
Uran-9 (Russia)

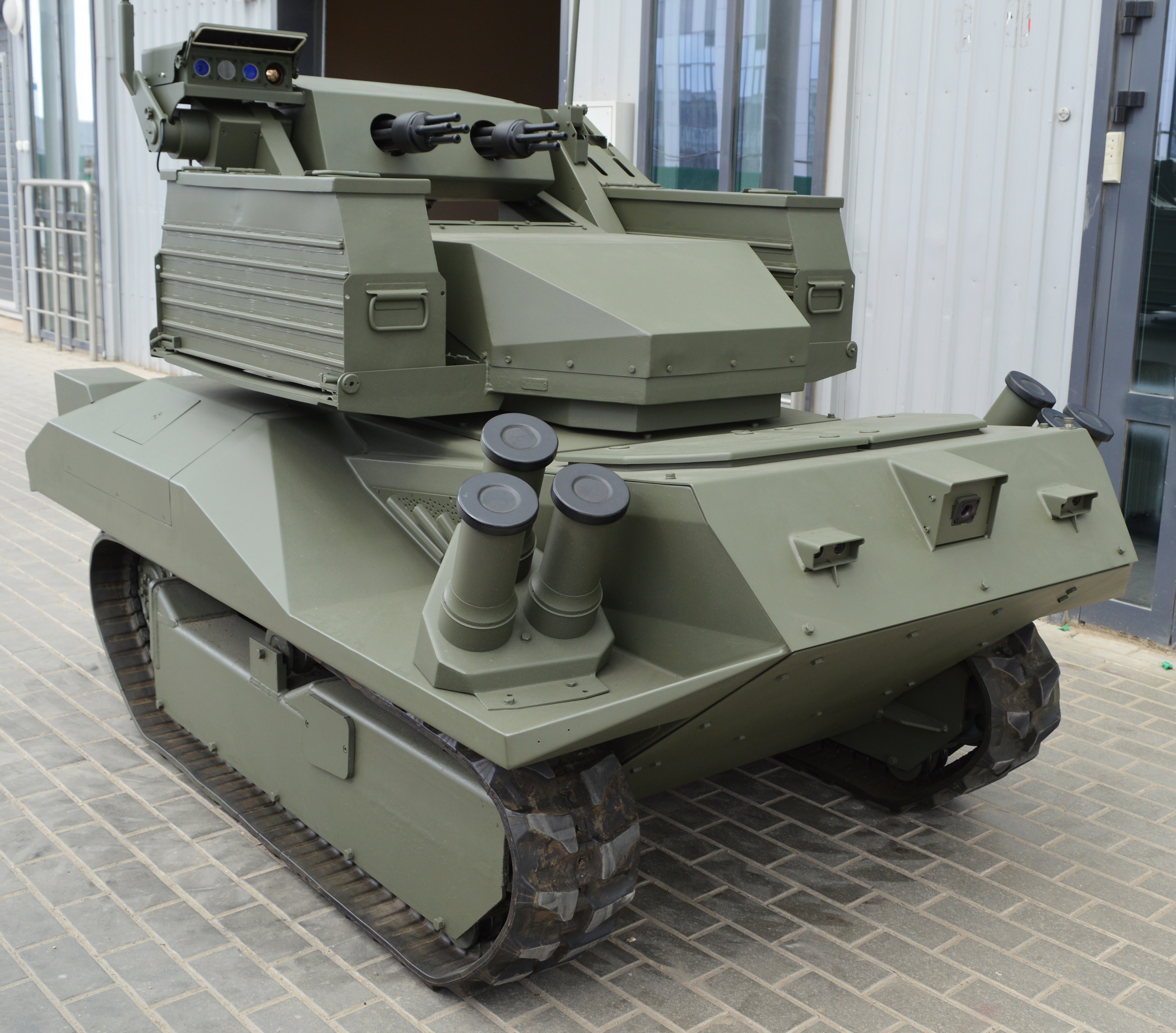
Berserk (Belarus)

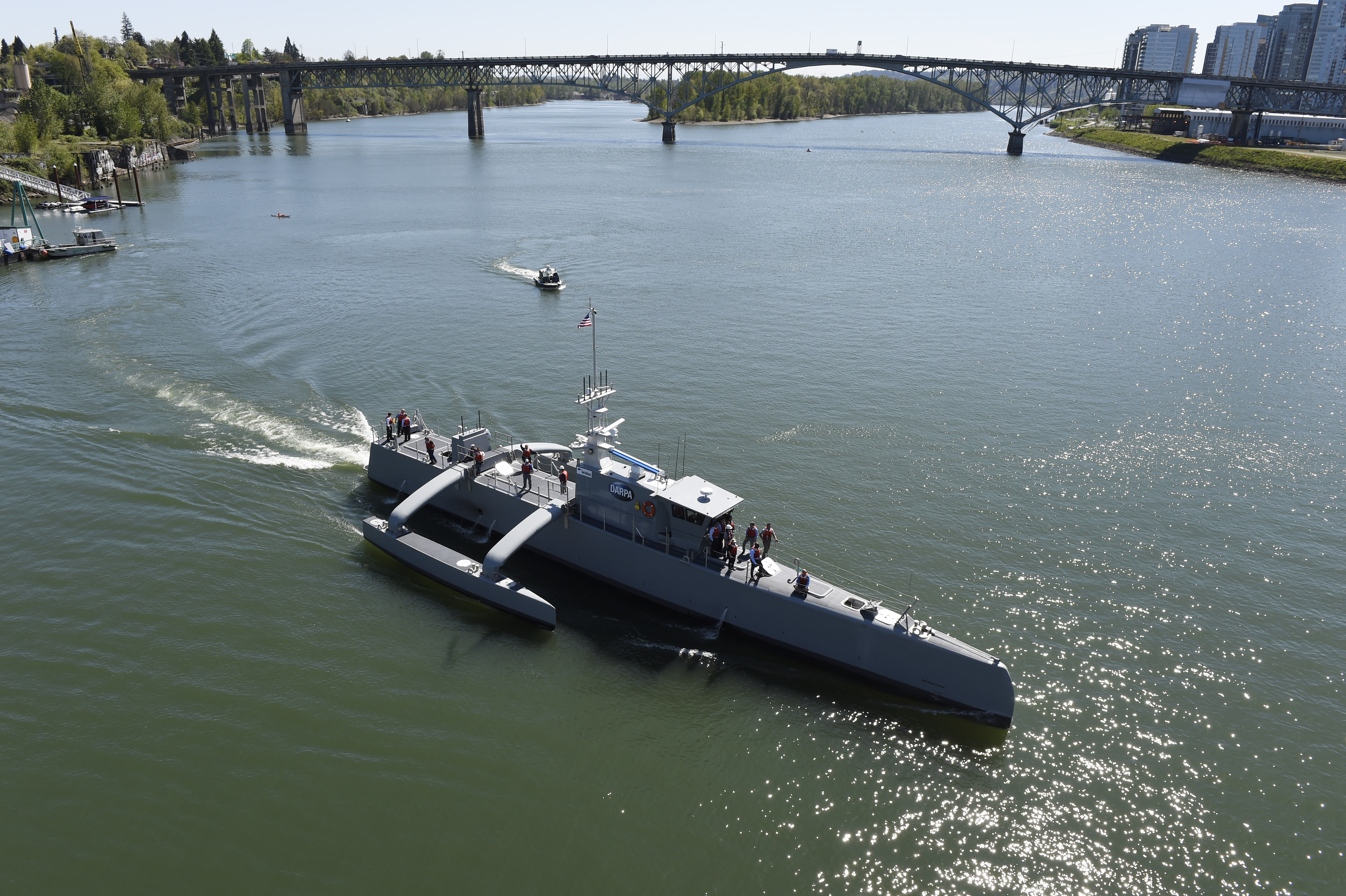
Sea Hunter (USA)

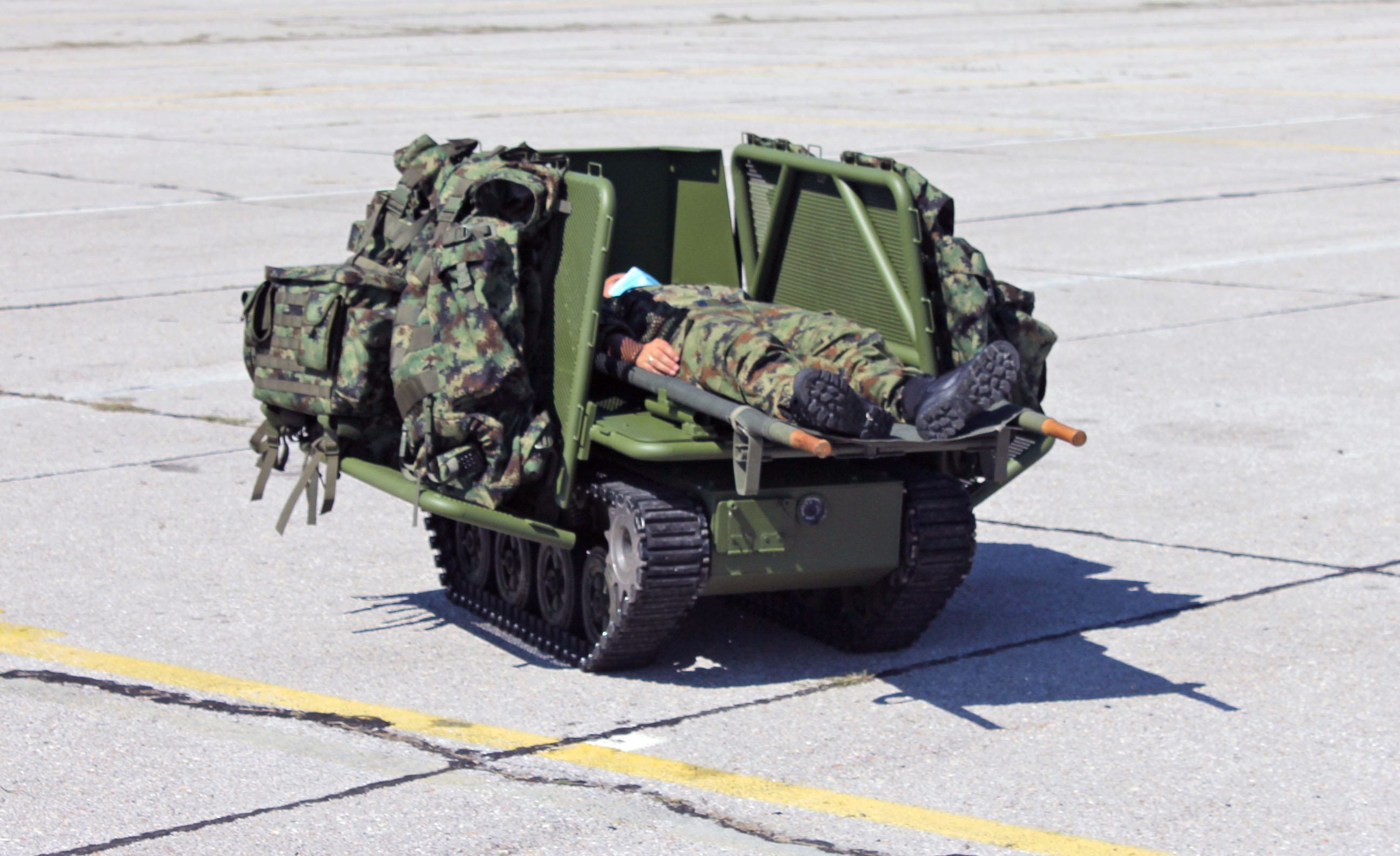
Miloš L (UGV), a military robot for evacuating the wounded from the battlefield

== See also ==
- DARPA Grand Challenge
- Group of Governmental Experts on Lethal Autonomous Weapons Systems
- Human-in-the-loop
- Lethal autonomous weapon
- Missile guidance
- Multi Autonomous Ground-robotic International Challenge
- Network-centric warfare
- Powered exoskeleton
- Roboethics
- Robot combat
- Robot Wars (disambiguation)
- Supersoldier
- Telerobotics
- Three Laws of Robotics
- Unmanned combat air vehicle
  - US battlefield UAVs
