= Crusher (robot) =

- Manufacturer: DARPA
- Year of creation: 2006
- Derived from: Spinner

Crusher is a 13,200-pound (6,000 kg) autonomous off-road Unmanned Ground Combat Vehicle developed by researchers at the Carnegie Mellon University's National Robotics Engineering Center for DARPA. It is a follow-up on the previous Spinner vehicle. DARPA's technical name for the Crusher is Unmanned Ground Combat Vehicle and Perceptor Integration System, and the whole project is known by the acronym UPI, which stands for Unmanned Ground Combat Vehicle PerceptOR Integration.

== Capabilities ==
The robot can travel over rough terrain, such as vertical walls more than 4 feet (1.2 m) high, wooded slopes, and rocky creekbeds. It can turn 180 degrees in place, raise and lower its suspension by 30 inches (76 cm), more than one-half the 49.5 inches (126 cm) diameter of the wheels, and lean to the side. The Crusher can carry 8,000 pounds (3,600 kg) of combined armor and cargo. According to Stephen Welby, director of DARPA's Tactical Technology Office, "This vehicle can go into places where, if you were following in a Humvee, you'd come out with spinal injuries." The Crusher can see enemy troops from over 2 miles (3.2 km) away with its cameras. The Crusher can climb up slopes of more than 40 degrees and travel with more than 30 degrees of slope to the side. When pushed to its maximum speed, the Crusher can travel at 26 miles per hour (42 km/h), but it can only sustain that speed for less than seven seconds.

== Construction ==
These robots have space frames (made of aluminum and titanium) and skid plates to protect the robot from heavy blows from objects like boulders. The Crusher also has a hybrid engine capable of travelling several miles on one battery charge. The diesel engine then turns on to continue powering the Crusher and to recharge the battery module. This diesel engine comes from a diesel Volkswagen Jetta.

== Controls ==
The Crusher has no driving controls because it is autonomous. Instead, the operators drive the Crusher with video game controllers. While driving between its waypoints via GPS, the Crusher continuously attempts to find the fastest and easiest path to its destination. For example, if it encounters an object more than 6 feet (1.8 m) high or a gorge more than 6 feet (1.8 m) deep, the Crusher will find a way around it.

The camera system uses five 1.9 megapixel color cameras, which give an overall field of view of 200 degrees horizontally and 30 degrees vertically at a resolution of over four times that of a normal television set. Currently, the Crusher sends data back to an operator via a 0.62 miles (1 km) long 0.063 inches (1.6 mm) wide fiber-optic cable.

== Purpose ==
The Crusher could be used for a number of missions considered highly dangerous for soldiers, such as fire support, reconnaissance, or medevac; as a supply mule; or as a sentry. John Bares, one of the people on the development team for the Crusher, mentions that medevac would be a good use for the robot because it could go into the battlefield under fire to scoop up fallen soldiers. There are no plans to put the Crusher vehicle into service. Instead, it will be used as the base for future unmanned vehicle designs.

== See also ==
- Autonomous robot
- List of military vehicles
- Multifunctional Utility/Logistics and Equipment
