= Multifunctional utility/logistics and equipment vehicle =

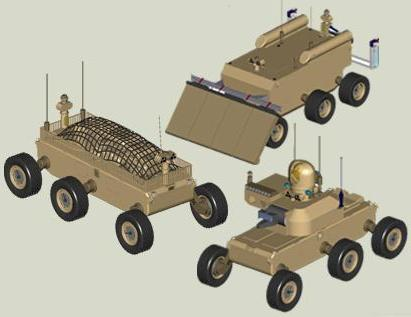
- From top to bottom:XM1218, XM1217, XM1219
- Type: Unmanned ground combat vehicle
- Place of origin: United States

Specifications
- Mass: 2.5 tons

The multi-mission unmanned ground vehicle, previously known as the multifunctional utility/logistics and equipment vehicle (MULE), was an autonomous unmanned ground combat vehicle developed by Lockheed Martin Missiles and Fire Control for the United States Army's Future Combat Systems and BCT modernization programs. The last component of the program was canceled in July 2011.

== Timeline ==
In $5.5 million, 18-month contract awarded July 2002 the Department of Defense selected Boeing Integrated Defense Systems to prototype a six-wheeled vehicle, then called "Stinger". Boeing's partner, Carnegie Mellon University's National Robotics Engineering Consortium, said it anticipated the armed vehicle could be fielded by 2008.

== Description ==
The Multifunctional Utility/Logistics and Equipment Vehicle was a 2.5-ton Unmanned Ground Vehicle (UGV) that was developed to support dismounted and air assault operations. The MULE was sling-loadable under military rotorcraft and featured a common chassis. As the program's centerpiece, the Common Mobility Platform (CMP) chassis provided mobility built around an advanced propulsion and articulated suspension system. This system gave the MULE the ability to negotiate complex terrain, obstacles, and gaps that a dismounted squad would encounter.

The MULE's unique, highly advanced 6x6 independent articulated suspension, coupled with in-hub motors powering each wheel, provided extreme mobility in complex terrain, far exceeding that of vehicles utilizing more conventional suspension systems. It could climb at least a 1-meter step traverse side slopes greater than 40 percent, ford water to depths over 0.5 meters and overpass obstacles as high as 0.5 meters, while compensating for varying payload weights and center of gravity locations.

== Variants ==
=== XM1217 transport ===
The XM1217 was canceled in December 2009 along with the XM1218. It would have been able to haul 860 to 1090 kg (1,900 to 2,400 pounds) of equipment.

=== XM1218 countermine ===
The countermine MULE vehicle (MULE-CM) (XM1218) would provide the capability to detect, mark, and neutralize anti-tank mines. The vehicle would be equipped with an integrated mine detection mission equipment package from the ground standoff mine detection system (GSTAMIDS). The XM1218 was canceled in December 2009.

=== XM1219 ARV-assault-light ===
The ARV-A-L Mule vehicle (ARV-A-L) (XM1219) would have featured an integrated weapons and reconnaissance, surveillance, and target acquisition (RSTA) package to support the dismounted infantry's efforts to locate and destroy enemy platforms and positions. The ARV-A-L would have supported both anti-tank and anti-personnel weapons platforms that will be remotely operated by network linked Soldiers. This variant was cancelled in July 2011.

== See also ==
- Gladiator tactical unmanned ground vehicle
- ACER
- Black Knight
- BigDog
- Crusher
- M-numbers
