= SWARM =

SWARM Remote Weapons System
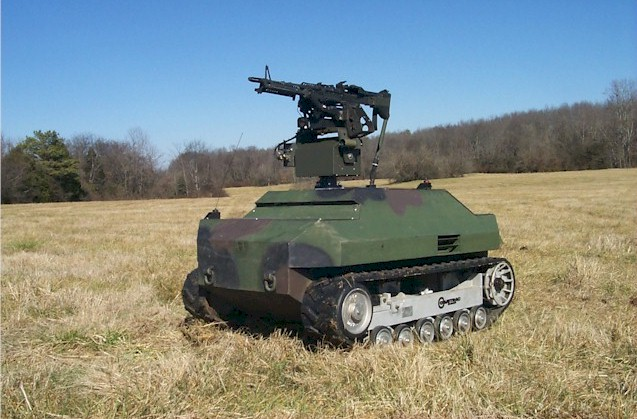
- SWARM WASP on a Gladiator TUGV
- Type: Remote Weapon System
- Place of origin: UK

Service history
- Used by: US Marine Corps, British Army, Royal Netherlands Army
- Wars: Iraq War, Afghanistan

Production history
- Designer: Thales Group
- Manufacturer: Thales Group
- Variants: SWARM Lite

Specifications
- Mass: 125 kg (excluding weapon and ammunition)
- Height: 650 mm/450 mm option
- Shell: 5.56 mm, 7.62 mm, 12.7 mm
- Traverse: 360
- Feed system: 200-600 Ready Rounds

The SWARM Remote Weapon System (Stabilised Weapon And Reconnaissance Mount) is a fully armored remote weapon system designed and built by the Thales Group in Glasgow, Scotland. The SWARM system consists of two main assemblies: the Gun Processing and Interface Unit (GPIU), which is operated inside the vehicle, and the external Weapon and Sensor Platform (WASP). It can fire a variety of weapons, and utilize multiple sensors. On the US Marine Corps' Gladiator tactical unmanned ground vehicle (TUGV), it is equipped with a 7.62 mm M240 and day/night sensors.

Currently used in conjunction with:

- US Marine Corps Gladiator tactical unmanned ground vehicle (TUGV)
- British Army Trojan AVRE
- FNSS Pars Armored Vehicle

== Specifications ==
- System Accuracy: Less than 1.5 milliradians (mil) (10 round burst).
- Minimum Tracking Speed: 0.01 degrees per second.
