= Autonomous Navigation System =

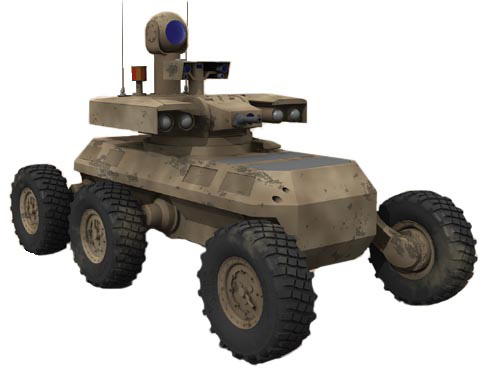
The XM1219 armed robotic vehicle would utilize the Autonomous Navigation System

The Autonomous Navigation System (ANS) was a 2007–2011 combat vehicle upgrade used to convert manned vehicles to autonomous unmanned capability or to upgrade already unmanned vehicles to be autonomous.

== Design ==
ANS was an on board, integrated suite of sensors and technology that enabled autonomous navigation, perception, path-planning and vehicle-following capabilities for unmanned ground vehicles, allowing them to move on the battlefield with minimal human oversight. Some tasks the system already performed in tests included move-on-route, obstacle detection and avoidance and leader/follower capabilities in both day and night conditions. Originally designed by the Army for integration on the armed robotic vehicle–assault (light) (ARV-A(L)), the ANS has also been tested on vehicles including Strykers, MULE engineering evaluation units, and light medium tactical vehicles (LMTV).

== History ==
The Critical Design Review found the ANS to be at a maturity level consistent with moving to the prototype fabrication phase and that its assessments and critical issues presented low risk with 95 percent of its requirements met. Closure of the CDR was expected in late August 2010. Prototype delivery was scheduled for late 2011 and Integrated Qualification Testing would begin in 2012. The Army ended development work on the system and ARV in July 2011 stating that the system "did not warrant continued investment,".

== Sources ==
This article incorporates work from , which is in the public domain as it is a work of the United States Military.
