= Robot wolf =

- Type: Military robot
- Place of origin: People’s Republic of China

Robot wolf (Chinese: 机器狼) is a type of Chinese weaponized quadrupedal military robot and a part of the unmanned ground combat vehicle platform for the People’s Liberation Army.

== History ==
While the PLA started deploying military robots since 2022 at the Sino-Indian border, its usage increased from 2024.

The term was first coined in November 2024 when a collection of such robots designed by the China South Industries Group defence firm were demonstrated at the 15th China Airshow in Zhuhai.

Robot wolves appeared in the 2025 China Victory Day Parade.

== Design ==
Based on commercial robots such as the Unitree Go2, robot wolves are based on the behaviour of wolves with high adaptability in various environments, including urban and amphibious settings.

Robot wolves may be outfitted with various equipment. They may be armed with options that include but are not limited to, QBZ-95 or QBZ-191 assault rifles, shotguns, rocket launchers, and missile launchers, to provide extra firepower to the squad.

== Users ==
- Armenia
- Pakistan
- China
