= Advanced Robotics for Manufacturing =

- Formation: 2017; 9 years ago
- Type: Public–private partnership
- Purpose: Robotics, Manufacturing
- Location: Pittsburgh, Pennsylvania, United States
- Key people: Jorgen Pedersen, CEO
- Website: arminstitute.org

Advanced Robotics for Manufacturing (ARM), also known as ARM Institute, is a consortium created in 2017 through a Department of Defense grant won by Carnegie Mellon University. ARM is structured as a public-private partnership and the Manufacturing USA Institutes, a network of 16 institutes dedicated to advancing technologies used in manufacturing. ARM was the 14th institute created and focuses on funding innovations in robotics and workforce development.

== History ==
ARM was founded in January 2017 as the 14th Manufacturing USA Institute with $80M in federal funding. A proposal team led by Carnegie Mellon University won the grant to create ARM, though more than 200 partners pledged support for the institute during the proposal phase.

In 2020, Ira Moskowitz was appointed CEO. Moskowitz served in that position until his retirement in 2025. Jorgen Pederson was named CEO in June 2025. Prior to ARM, Pederson was a co-founder of Carnegie Mellon University’s National Robotics Engineering Center and RE2 Robotics, a developer of human-like robotic arms for unstructured environments.

== Structure ==
Like the other Manufacturing USA institutes, ARM operates as a membership-based consortium with more than 200 national members spanning industry, academia, and government. ARM periodically releases separate technology and workforce development project calls. Members then form teams to bid for funding. The project calls center on areas where robotics and/or better workforce development initiatives could solve problems in the national manufacturing sector

== Headquarters ==
ARM is headquartered in the Hazelwood (Pittsburgh), Pennsylvania, in a co-location with Carnegie Mellon University's Manufacturing Futures Institute at Mill 19.

ARM marked the opening of its headquarters on 4 September 2019. ARM and Carnegie Mellon were the first two tenants on the site, which is on one of the three planned buildings, on a 90,000 square-foot facility, with the site having remained empty for 15 years.

In January 2022, United States President Joe Biden visited the location to deliver a speech on infrastructure and job creation in support of his Build Back Better Plan. In October 2022, ARM announced the opening of its Florida office in the Tampa Bay Innovation Center in St. Petersburg.

== See also ==
- List of robotics software
