= Energid Technologies =

Energid Technologies, Corp.
- Industry: Robotics, Machine Vision
- Founded: 2001
- Headquarters: Bedford, Massachusetts
- Products: Actin Robotic Control Software
- Website: energid.com

Energid Technologies is an engineering firm providing robotics, machine vision, and remote control software with the core product referred to as Actin. Its headquarters are in Bedford, Massachusetts. It has regional presence in Bedford, Massachusetts, New York, New York; Pittsburgh, Pennsylvania; Tucson, Arizona; Austin, Texas; and Chicago, Illinois. Energid also has an international presence in Bangalore, India. Energid Technologies develops tools for robotic applications in the industrial, agriculture, transportation, defense, and medical industries. Energid's Actin and Selectin products provide advanced robotics technology in the form of extendable software toolkits. Actin is in release 5.5 and provides control and tasking for complex multi-robot systems. Energid has applied its software to control robots for seafloor oil exploration, nuclear reactor inspection, and citrus harvesting.

In May 2019, Energid was named to the RBR50 2019, an annual list of the top 50 robotics companies by Robotics Business Review.

== History ==
Energid Technologies was founded in 2001 by Neil Tardella and James English. It is a Florida corporation headquartered in Bedford, Massachusetts.
