= Stephen Welby =

Stephen Welby is an American science and technology leader and policy executive.

== White House OSTP Head of National Security ==
Welby was appointed Deputy Executive Director of the White House Office of Science and Technology policy in the Biden Administration, leading the National Security division.

In this role, he led the federal government's R&D efforts around sensitive technologies and technologies critical to national security, including around artificial intelligence, dual use technologies, and nuclear energy, working closely with the National Security Council, DOD, and U.S. intelligence community.

== Department of Defense CTO ==
Welby was nominated by President Obama to serve as the DOD Assistant Secretary for Defense Research and Engineering (DOD ASD-R&E), and was confirmed by the Senate in December 2015. In this role he also serves as the Chief Technology Officer of the DOD.

== IEEE Exec Director ==
Welby served as the Executive Director of the IEEE (largest global organization for engineers, scientists, and computer scientists) for five years before going to the White House.

== Background ==
Welby received his B.S. in chemical engineering at Cooper Union, MBA at Texas A&M, and M.S. in computer engineering at Johns Hopkins.
