= SGR-A1 =

Samsung SGR-A1
- Type: Sentry gun
- Place of origin: South Korea

The SGR-A1 is a type of autonomous sentry gun that was jointly developed by Samsung Techwin (now Hanwha Aerospace) and Korea University to assist South Korean troops in the Korean Demilitarized Zone. It is widely considered as the first unit of its kind to have an integrated system that includes surveillance, tracking, firing, and voice recognition. While units of the SGR-A1 have been reportedly deployed, their number is unknown due to the project being "highly classified".

== Development and origin ==
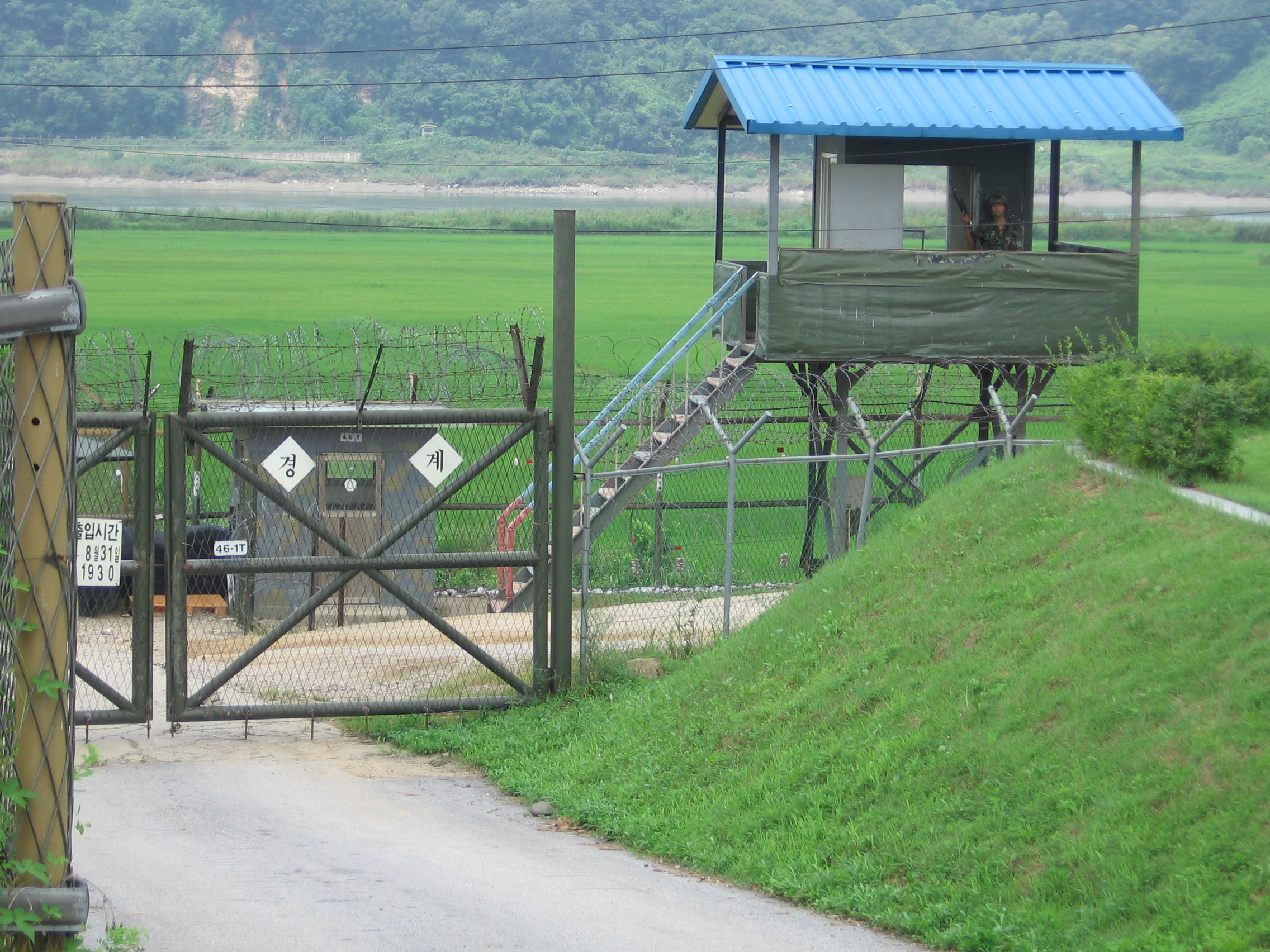
Guards at a South Korean checkpoint facing away from the DMZ in 2005

The Samsung SGR-A1 project started with an initial investment by the South Korean government in 2003 and was developed by four institutions led primarily by Hanwha Techwin and Korea University. With prototypes produced in 2006, the system was designed to replace human-oriented guarding along the Korean Demilitarized Zone (DMZ) and to provide the "perfect guard operation". The primary goal of the project, as quoted by Shin Hyun-don from the South Korean defense ministry "is to transform the current guard and observation mission on fronts conducted by soldiers into a robot system". The entirety of the 250 kilometres (160 mi) DMZ is heavily patrolled and is touted as the most militarized border in the world, despite its name. This, combined with the fact that South Korea's military personnel is nearly half the size of North Korea's, may have influenced the South Korean government's decision to invest more in autonomous robot guards.

== Design ==
=== General characteristics ===
- Type: Lethal autonomous weapons system (LAWS) (stationary)
- Weight: 117 kg (about 258 lbs)
- Height: 120 cm (about 47 in)
- Effective range: 0-3.2 km (about 0–2 miles)
- Daytime sensor detection range: 0–4 km (about 0–2.5 miles)
- Nighttime sensor detection range: about 0–2 km (approx. 0–1.2 miles)

=== Features ===
Many of the Samsung SGR-A1's features resemble the standard sentry gun and similar automated stationary weapons like the Super aEgis II and the Israeli Sentry Tech systems. The system, costing approximately $200,000 (227 million won), includes an uncooled infrared thermographic camera for detection, a weapons interface that allows for mounted weapons, and a combination of an IR illuminator and a laser rangefinder to track and follow targets. It also includes a digital video recorder which captures footage for up to 60 days and three other cameras used separately for surveillance, tracking and zoom.

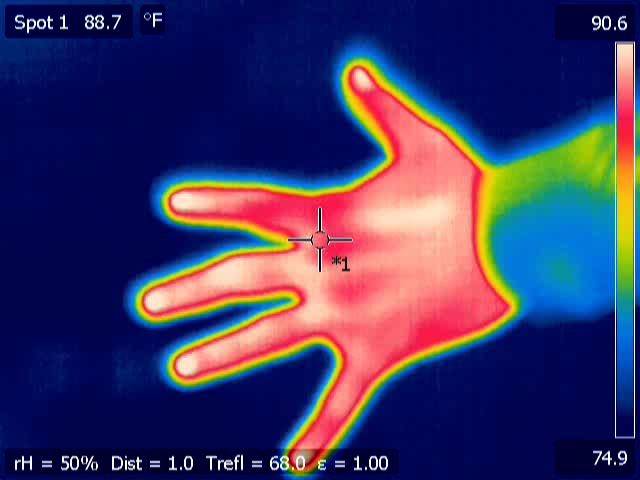
A thermal image of a human hand produced by a thermographic camera

The Samsung SGR-A1 presumes any person entering the DMZ is an enemy and, upon detection, will attempt to identify the target through voice recognition. If a proper access code is not provided within a short amount of time, the system can choose between sounding an alarm, firing rubber bullets or engaging the target with other weapons. The system can also be overridden by an operator, who can also communicate via built-in microphone and audio system.

=== Components and armaments ===
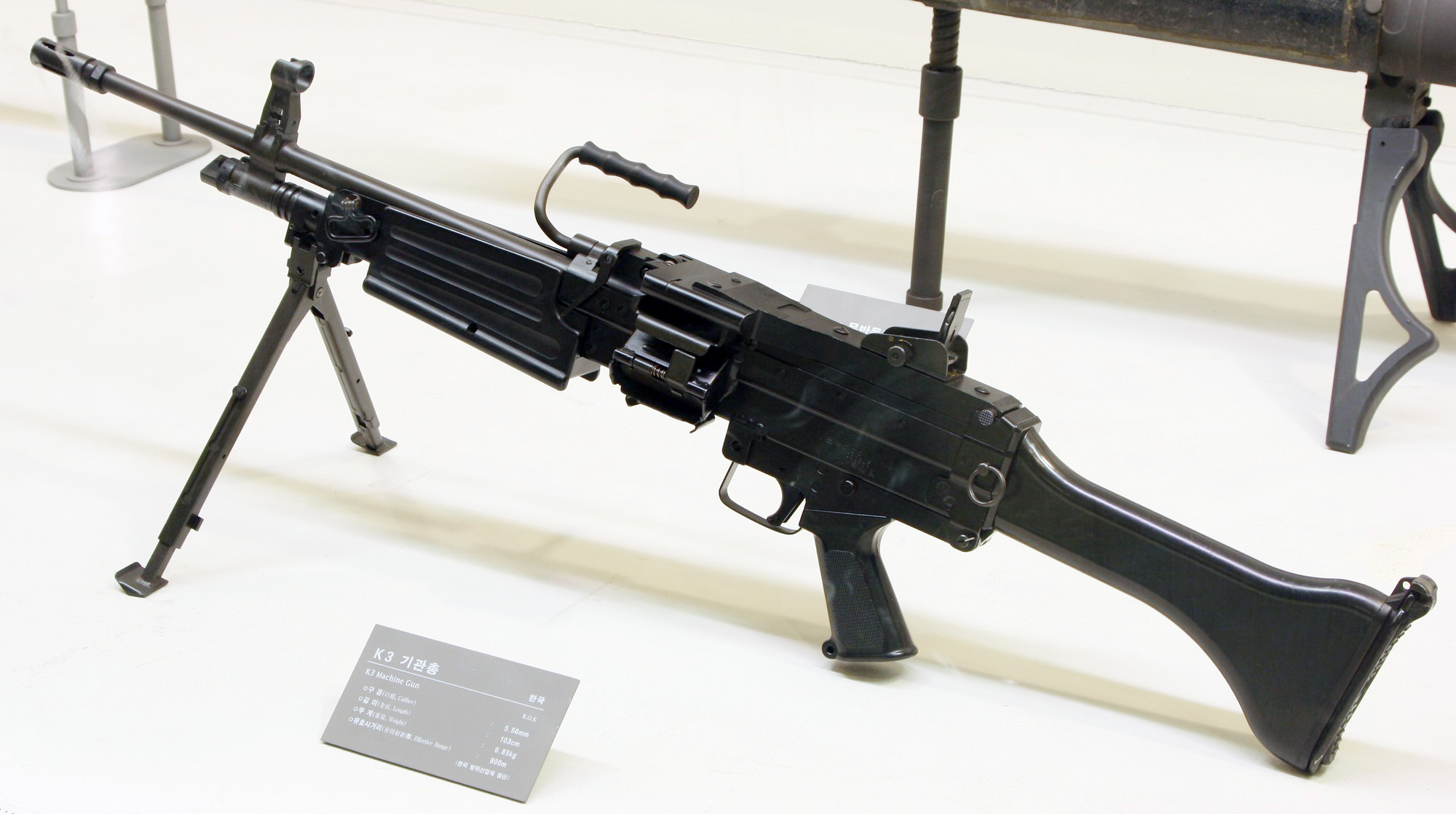
Daewoo K3 LMG, the stock weapon on the Samsung SGR-A1

- Laser rangefinder: A type of rangefinder which calculates distance by measuring the time it takes for a laser pulse to reach a target and return the signal to its sender.
- Uncooled infrared thermographic camera: Detectors made of temperature-dependent pyroelectric and ferroelectric materials which form pixels that are read electronically thus forming images. Capable of seeing illumination down to 0.0008 lux (lumens per square meter).
- Infrared (IR) illuminator: A type of active night vision device (NVD) that allows images to be produced in light levels that near complete darkness.
- Mounted weapons (stock)
  - Daewoo Precision Industries K3: 5.56 x 45-mm automatic light machine-gun with up to 1000 rounds/min rate of fire.
  - Milkor MGL: A lightweight 40-mm multiple-grenade launcher.

== Controversy around the Samsung SGR-A1 ==
The development of the Samsung SGR-A1 (and LAWS in general) has sparked considerable controversy regarding their effect on aggression between states, the issue on ethics of autonomous killing, and innocent killings through collateral damage.

=== "Human in/over the loop" controversy ===
A human-in-the-loop (HITL) system, if applied to the Samsung SGR-A1, would mean the weapon must wait for commands from a human operator before acting upon its targets. This contrasts with a human over the loop (HOTL) system, which would allow the Samsung SGR-A1 to autonomously engage targets while allowing for human intervention to stop it. Opposition groups against the use of the Samsung SGR-A1 and laws including the Committee on International Security and Arms Control and Human Rights Watch believe the Samsung SGR-A1 has HOTL capabilities, and would ultimately increase civilian casualties and lower the threshold for going to war.

==== Primary arguments by anti-LAWS groups ====
- LAWS are unethical because humans are no longer involved in the act of killing, which absents morality from warfare by ultimately pitting a machine against a human.
- LAWS increase the risk of conflict and war by shifting risks from the nation's soldiers to machines, which distances civilians from war and thus changes how the military and government think about going to war.
- LAWS introduce a difficulty of assigning responsibility and accountability if scenarios including civilian casualties and violation of international law arise.

Many of these opposing arguments, however, are based on the idea that the Samsung SGR-A1 is a truly autonomous, HOTL system, which has been a heavily disputed topic. A 2008 study, done by California Polytechnic State University's Naval Department, suggested that the Samsung SGR-A1 is a fully autonomous system and reports by major news outlets including The Atlantic, BBC, and NBC also confirm their conclusion. A quote from the report reads, "The firing of the gun can be done manually by a soldier or by the robot in fully-automatic (autonomous) mode." Despite published studies confirming the weapon's autonomy, Samsung Techwin has openly denied that the Samsung SGR-A1 has autonomous functionality. In a 2010 response to a Popular Science article regarding the autonomy of the Samsung SGR-A1, Samsung Techwin Spokesperson, Huh Kwang-hak stated "the robots, while having the capability of automatic surveillance, cannot automatically fire at detected foreign objects or figures."

== See also ==
- Foster-Miller TALON
- XM1219 armed robotic vehicle
- Gladiator tactical unmanned ground vehicle
