= Armored Combat Engineer Robot =

The Armored Combat Engineer Robot (ACER) is a military robot created by Mesa Robotics. Roughly the size of a small bulldozer and weighing 2.25 tons, ACER is among the larger military robots. ACER is able to reach speeds of 6.3 mph, using treads for movement. Uses for this robot include clearing obstacles, removing explosives, hauling cargo and disabled vehicles, and serving as a platform for various other tasks, such as clearing buildings and disarming landmines and lasermines.

== See also ==
- PackBot
- Gladiator tactical unmanned ground vehicle
