= XM1219 armed robotic vehicle =

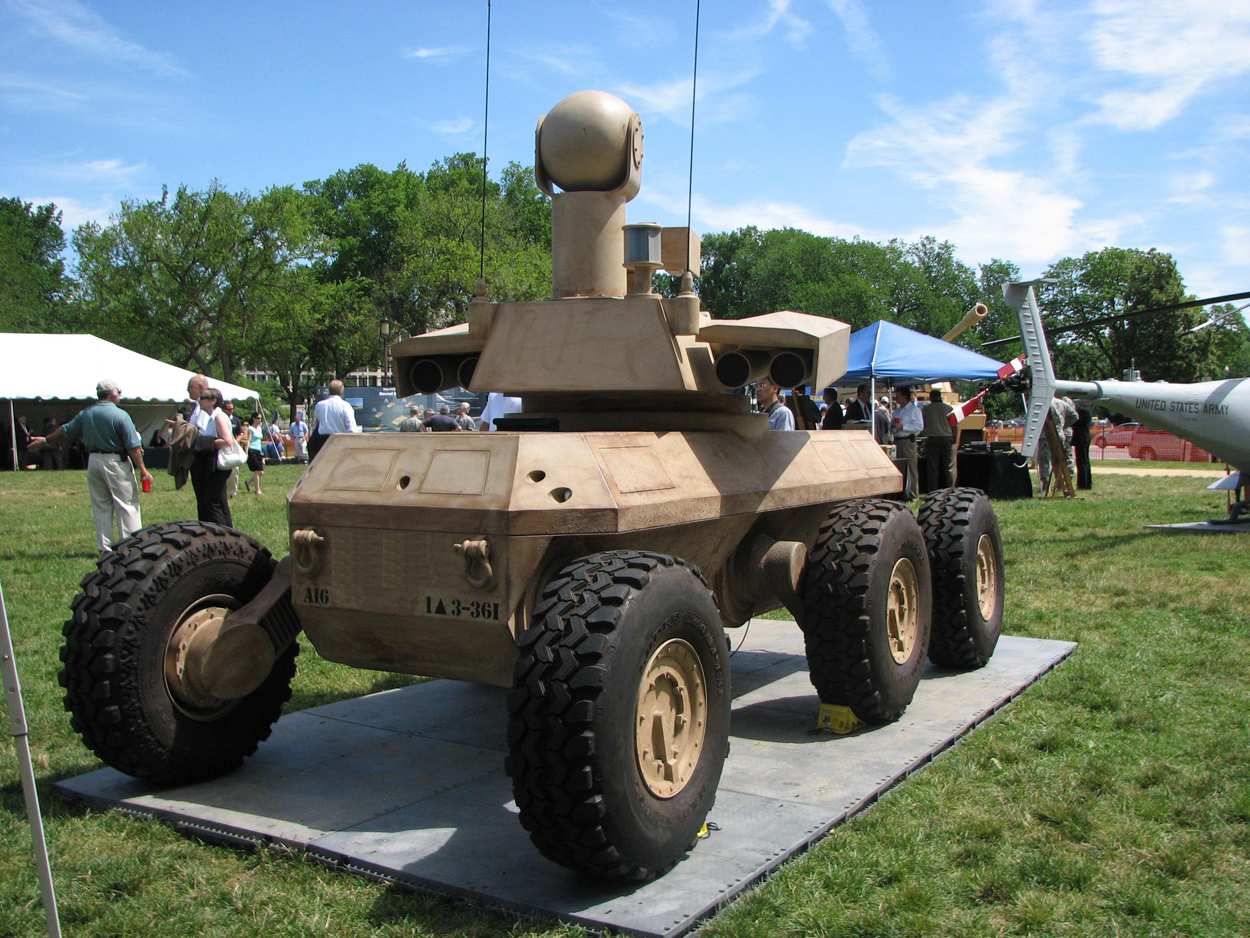
- XM1219 ARV-Assault-Light (ARV-A-L) MULE Vehicle
- Type: Armed robotic vehicle
- Place of origin: United States

Service history
- In service: Cancelled with rest of FCS program

Production history
- Manufacturer: Lockheed Martin Corporation / The Boeing Company

Specifications
- Mass: 2.5 short tons (2.3 t)
- Main armament: Line-of-sight gun
- Secondary armament: Anti tank weapons
- Engine: 6x6 in-hub electric motors Diesel-electric
- Guidance system: Robotic / command control

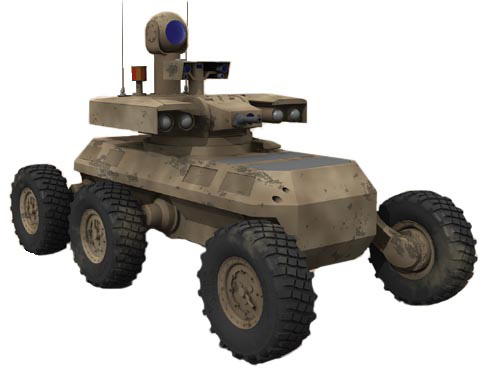
The armed robotic vehicle (ARV) variant of the MULE

The XM1219 armed robotic vehicle was an unmanned ground combat vehicle based on the MULE Platform. The ARV-A-L MULE Vehicle (XM1219) would feature integrated anti-tank and anti-personnel and reconnaissance, surveillance, and target acquisition (RSTA) systems remotely operated by network linked soldiers. The armed robotic vehicle was canceled in July 2011 over mobility concerns.

== Design ==
- The MULE platform is controlled by a modified Xbox 360 controller for ease of training recruits familiar with console controllers.

== Mobility ==
- Transportable inside a C-130 Hercules and CH-47 Chinook.
- Transportable, slung under a UH-60 Black Hawk.
- Climb more than a 1 metre (3 ft 3 in) step.
- Cross a 1 metre (3 ft 3 in) gap.
- Traverse side slopes of 40 percent.
- Ford water obstacles over 0.5 metres (1 ft 8 in).
- Cross obstacles as high as 0.5 metres (1 ft 8 in).

== Variants ==
=== Assault ===
The only production variant of this vehicle was the assault light (ARV-A-L).

== See also ==
- Foster-Miller TALON – (United States)
- Gladiator tactical unmanned ground vehicle – (United States)
- SGR-A1 – (South Korea)
- MGM-166 LOSAT, a canceled U.S. Army line-of-sight missile
- Mobile Protected Firepower, an ongoing U.S. Army light tank acquisition program
- XM1202 mounted combat system, a U.S. Army Future Combat Systems 20-ton tank canceled in 2011
- M1134 anti-tank guided missile vehicle, a Stryker tank destroyer variant
