= Black Knight (vehicle) =

Type of unmanned combat vehicle

Production history
- Designer: BAE Systems

Specifications
- Length: 5 m (16 ft 5 in)
- Width: 2.4 m (7 ft 10 in)
- Height: 2 m (6 ft 7 in)
- Main armament: 30 mm cannon
- Secondary armament: 7.62 mm machine gun
- Engine: Caterpillar diesel 300 hp (220 kW)
- Maximum speed: 77 km/h (48 mph)

The Black Knight is a prototype unmanned ground combat vehicle (UGCV) designed by BAE Systems. It weighs approximately 12 tons and is deployable from a Lockheed C-130 Hercules; ie airlifted by military transport aircraft. Similar in appearance to a tank, it is armed with a turret-mounted 30 mm gun and a 7.62 mm coaxial machine gun. The vehicle is fitted with a 300-horsepower (220 kW) Caterpillar Inc. diesel engine. The vehicle is currently being evaluated by the US Army. It is a proof of concept for military unmanned vehicles, specifically as a combat asset.

== History ==
The project began as the ARD, or Armed Robotic Demonstrator. Designed in 2005 and 2006, its purpose was to evaluate the performance of previous unmanned vehicles. In 2006, the ARD made its first public appearance at the Association of the United States Army in Washington D.C. The following year, a remote operation capability was added because of all the interest it received during that same convention in Washington. They showcased the Black Knight's new attributes in an annual experiment named Air Assault Expeditionary Force (AAEF) in Fort Benning, GA. As soon as the vehicle passed safety trials, it underwent testing during the fall of 2007. After 200 hours of operation, the Black Knight was able to perform tasks successfully.

BAE reintroduced the Black Knight in March 2017 as the Armed Robotic Combat Vehicle (ARCV).

== Characteristics ==
The Black Knight is capable of being used off-road meaning that it go through any type of terrain such as rocks or water. The vehicle is used in military tests that allows Soldiers to figure out the major roles of the tank in order to use it in a more advanced military force. Because of its autonomous and semi-autonomous (being able to control itself and be controlled by someone else) components this helps operators plan an efficient plan of attack as well as avoiding obstacles while finding its way from point A to point B. It also consists of three modules: the Robotics Operator, the Mission Commander, and the Safety Officer each serving their own purpose. The Black Knight is basically operated through the Robotics Operator Control Station (ROCS) which is inside an armed vehicle. Meaning that it controls the remote and autonomous operations while the Mission Commander has the task of reading the data and then transferring it to the whole system allowing it to better direct the robotics operator. The Safety Officer controls the remote hand controller which is used when there's an unsafe situation and an emergency stop command is needed. Its main role is to ensure the safety of those around the vehicle and after each task, it needs to be remotely parked in a certain location like a garage or onto a truck.

=== Remote operation ===
==== Advantages ====
UGCVs (Unmanned Ground Combat Vehicles) can be used at any time of the day missions deemed too dangerous for manned ground vehicles, including forward scouting, RSTA, intelligence gathering, and investigating hazardous areas. Its biggest advantage is that the unmanned vehicle can investigate areas that are too hazardous for a group of soldiers to see or check and it can be controlled by a Dismounted Control Device. These advantages allow operators to receive data from unmanned forward positions and verify their plan of attack by utilizing the information they received from the map data to check for unsafe conditions or obstacles. The Black Knight can be controlled by soldiers safely from inside a manned fighting vehicle (Bradley Fighting Vehicle) giving them protection. The Black Knight's computer system allows it to perform a variety of functions by itself such as moving the turret, navigation, and planning a route.

==== Challenges ====
The technology driving Black Knight is still a work in progress, with limitations in its GPS, sensors, and wireless communication. However, the one with the most limitations is wireless communication. The biggest challenge is making sure that the vehicle is safe without affecting its capability to do certain functions, as well as focusing on how to create the tank in a more efficient and easy way.

== See also ==
- Gladiator tactical unmanned ground vehicle
- Ripsaw (vehicle)
- Wiesel AWC
