= AvantGuard =

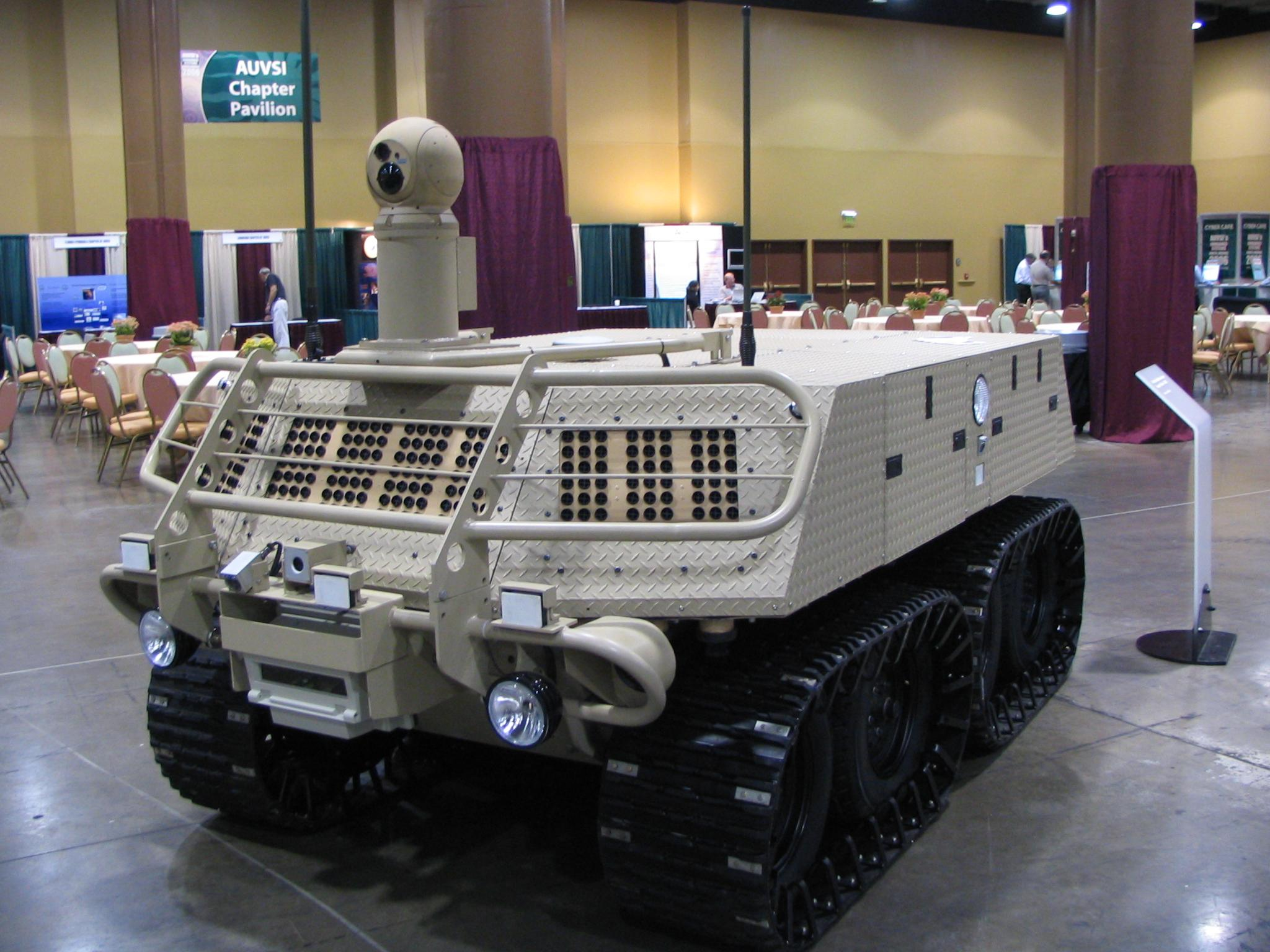

AvantGuard is a modular military robot unmanned ground combat vehicle developed by G-NIUS Unmanned Ground Systems in Israel.

== History ==
The AvantGuard has four wheel stations on either side of the vehicle powered by Kubota V3800DI-T four-cylinder 100hp turbodiesel engine. The vehicle has a maximum speed of 20km/h (12mph).

G-NIUS is jointly owned by Israel Aerospace Industries (IAI) and Elbit Systems. It employs a set of modular payloads such as: Ground Penetrating Radar, Counter IED Jammer, Mini-Pop cooled thermal surveillance camera, Counter Human & Vehicle Detection Radar.

== See also ==
- Guardium
- Robattle
