= Howe & Howe Tech =

- Country of origin: United States
- Original language: English
- No. of seasons: 2
- No. of episodes: 12

Production
- Producer: Authentic Entertainment
- Running time: 40–45 minutes

Original release
- Network: Discovery Channel
- Release: January 5, 2010 – February 2, 2011

Howe & Howe Tech, also called Black Ops Brothers by Authentic Entertainment Inc., is a reality television series produced by Authentic Entertainment for the Discovery Channel. It documents the day-to-day activities of identical twin brothers Michael "Mike" and Geoffrey "Geoff" Howe, who operate a small business out of Waterboro, Maine called Howe & Howe Technologies. The first season aired from January 5 to February 9, 2010, while the second season, having the title Black Ops Brothers: Howe & Howe Tech, had its run from December 13 in the same year up to February 2, 2011. The show's title is shorthand for the company name.

Howe & Howe Technologies specializes in fabrication and design of armored and military-grade vehicles, some even ordered by the US military. Their products include the Badger, recognized as the world's smallest armored assault vehicle by Guinness World Records; the SR1, or Subterranean Rover 1; and the Ripsaw, touted as the world's fastest dual tracked vehicle. Mike is the president of the company and chief engineer while Geoff is the CEO and company manager. Aside from a ten-man crew who help build the concept vehicles conceptualized by the brothers, the show also features the twins' wives, Tammy and Tracy, themselves sisters who each serve as a secretary for each other twin.

== Episodes ==
=== Season 1 (2010) ===
No. overall	No. in season	Title	Original release date
1	1	"Badger Goes Boom"	January 5, 2010
Members of a SWAT unit put in a request to see a field test of a fully functioning Badger, the world's smallest armored tank. But after the last blast test blew its tracks to pieces, the Howe brothers are left scrambling to resurrect the Badger. Adding to the time crunch, the crew at H&H is still working on building three Subterranean Rovers for a mining company and they're way behind. And with so many projects in full swing, the twins still need to find a shop big enough to fit their growing business.
2	2	"Subterranean Rover Blues"	January 12, 2010
Geoff is inspired to build a hi-speed concept-vehicle, the Personal Assault Lander (PAL), that can travel on water and land. It's been a life-long dream of his, and despite the company's deadlines, he decides now is the time to do it. But H&H is having trouble fabricating a fleet of Subterranean Rovers and is way behind schedule. In a reversal of their usual roles, Mike is being the responsible one, worrying about their core business, while Geoff is focusing on a far-out research and development project. The tension only grows as the PAL hits some serious speed bumps and the Rovers fall further behind. Will Geoff hit another R&D home-run or will his pet project sink H&H?
3	3	"Ripsaw Revolution"	January 19, 2010
The US Army asks the Howe brothers to modify their most famous vehicles, two high-speed tanks called Ripsaw MS1 and Ripsaw MS2. Ripsaw MS1 is a remote controlled tank and Ripsaw MS2 is a manned version. Now, Mike and Geoff must make Ripsaw MS2 operate remotely as well. In the middle of it all, Mike, Geoff and their amazing Ripsaws must star in a TV show called "Popular Science: The Future Of..." The publicity is great, but the rigorous test-drive for the TV cameras ruins the wheels on MS-2 and the twins have to order new ones. Will the new wheels arrive on time? And will a last minute technical glitch jeopardize H&H's all important military contracts?
4	4	"Ripsaw's Mini Me"	January 26, 2010
Geoff and Mike get the idea to build a miniature version of the Ripsaw, H&H's ultra-fast military tank. They call their newest invention "Mini-Rip" and market it to the general public as a recreational vehicle. The twins hope to finish Mini-Rip just in time to debut at the annual Grass Drags, a large motor-sports event in New Hampshire. Meanwhile, H&H gets an order for three more SR-1 Subterranean Rovers and Geoff has to go down to Ft. Hood, Texas to show off the Ripsaw's amazing abilities in hopes of getting more contracts with the Army. Managing several large projects at once puts a strain on the brothers' relationship and jeopardizes the completion of their latest and greatest machine.
5	5	"Personal Assault Lander"	February 2, 2010
Geoff is inspired to build a hi-speed concept-vehicle, the Personal Assault Lander (PAL), that can travel on water and land. It's been a life-long dream of his, and despite the company's deadlines, he decides now is the time to do it. But H&H is having trouble fabricating a fleet of Subterranean Rovers and is way behind schedule. In a reversal of their usual roles, Mike is being the responsible one, worrying about their core business, while Geoff is focusing on a far-out research and development project. The tension only grows as the PAL hits some serious speed bumps and the Rovers fall further behind. Will Geoff hit another R&D home-run or will his pet project sink H&H?
6	6	"Badger Resurrection"	February 9, 2010
Members of a SWAT unit put in a request to see a field test of a fully functioning Badger, the world's smallest armored tank. But after the last blast test blew its tracks to pieces, the Howe brothers are left scrambling to resurrect the Badger. Adding to the time crunch, the crew at H&H is still working on building three Subterranean Rovers for a mining company and they're way behind. And with so many projects in full swing, the twins still need to find a shop big enough to fit their growing business

=== Season 2 (2010–2011) ===
No. overall	No. in season	Title	Original release date
7	1	"Back on Tracks"	December 13, 2010
The Howes have a new shop, a new female welder, and a crazy new idea that might just revolutionize fire fighting. A request from the Army has the team creating a new set of Ripsaw tracks for the sole purpose of blowing them up in as many ways as possible.
8	2	"Trial By Fire"	December 20, 2010
The Howe & Howe team almost breaks their fire-fighting robot preparing it for testing with the fire department. Mike's Ripsaw weapons demonstration for the Army is a huge hit and hatches the idea for the Howes' next big R&D gamble.
9	3	"One For the Vets"	January 5, 2011
Mike and Geoff are underway on their new amphibious tank, but a Vietnam Vet's email takes them on a detour to build an all-terrain wheelchair. The team's competition to build prototype ballistic armor for the tank has an explosive ending.
10	4	"Hollywood Howes"	January 12, 2011
The Howes take on building and testing a prop vehicle for a major motion picture. Meanwhile the crew moves forward on the Riptide amphibious vehicle, including a dangerous test of its escape hatch system underwater.
11	5	"Robo Sniper"	January 26, 2011
Time is ticking on the Riptide project. The Howe & Howe team bears down, but their first test with the Riptide is disastrous. But it's not all bad news. Mike's seemingly tangent project -- a turret for the Riptide -- is an explosive success.
12	6	"Riptide Revealed"	February 2, 2011
It's the eleventh hour for the Howe & Howe team, one week before they present the amphibious Riptide to the Army. With a key member in the hospital, the team will have to scramble more than ever to fix what caused catastrophic engine failure.
