= Unmanned military vehicles =

Unmanned military vehicles may refer to:

- Unmanned aerial vehicle
- Unmanned combat air vehicle
- Unmanned naval vehicle
- Unmanned ground vehicle
