= Robattle =

Robattle, stylized RoBattle (a portmanteau of robot and battle), is a modular military robot unmanned ground vehicle developed by Israel Aerospace Industries.

== Overview ==
It is designed to undertake certain tasks otherwise done by infantry soldiers, such as convoy protection, armed reconnaissance and others. It moves on six wheels, but these can be replaced with tracks. The robot is capable of traversing uneven terrain and going over some obstacles such as low walls. Robattle's modularity allows it to be fitted with robotic arms, radars and weapons, allowing it to engage in combat. As such, sensitive systems in the Robattle are redundant to allow it to operate after taking damage.

The Robattle weighs 7 tons and has the capability of carrying up to 3 tons. It communicates using 4G cellular technology (LTE).

== Users ==
In 2022, it was reported that the Spanish military was testing the Robattle, along with other unmanned ground vehicles.

== See also ==
- Guardium
- AvantGuard
