= Ripsaw (vehicle) =

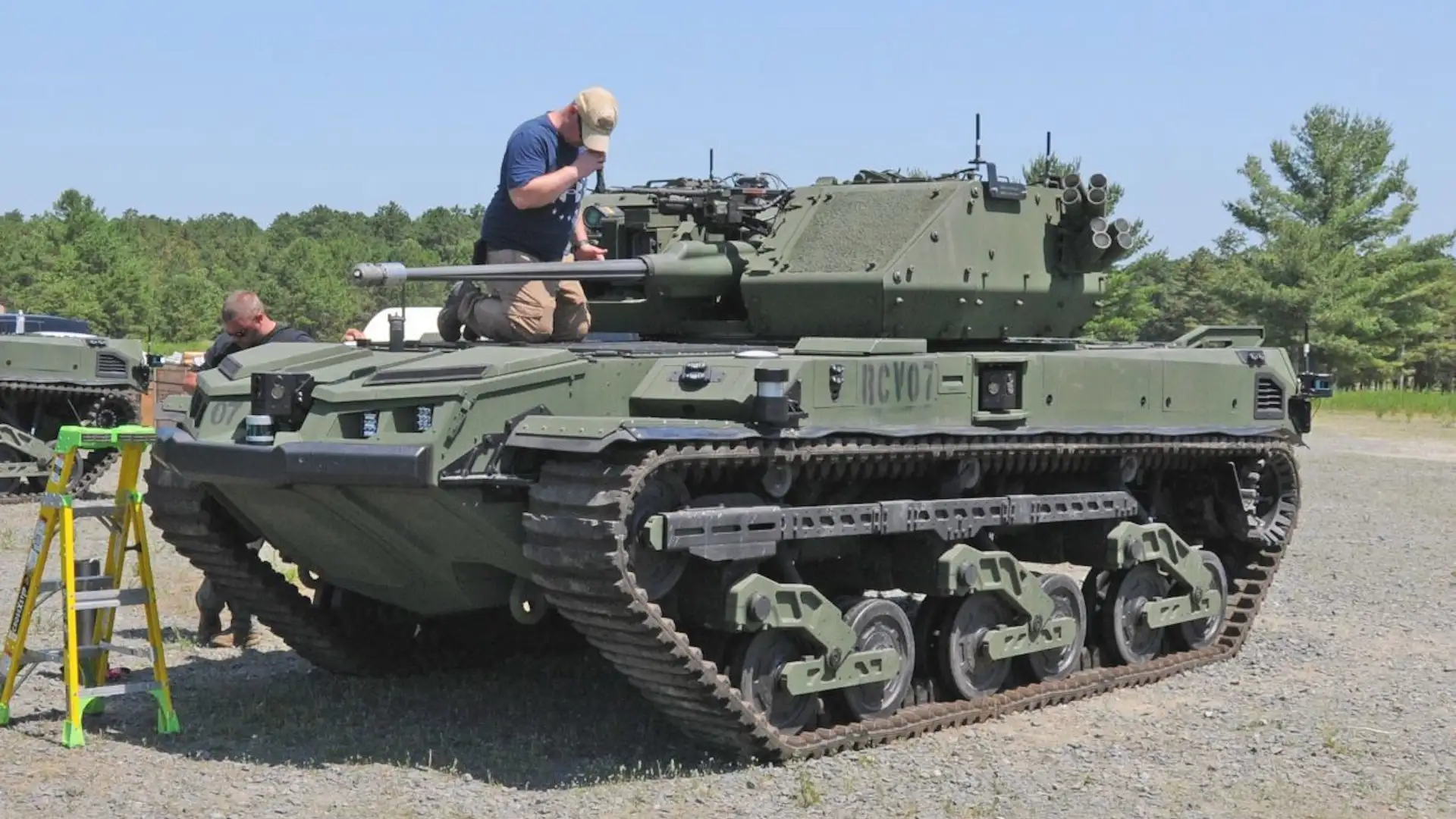
- A Ripsaw M5 fitted with a Kongsberg RT40 turret in U.S. Army testing at Fort Dix, New Jersey in 2021.
- Type: Unmanned ground vehicle
- Place of origin: United States

Production history
- Designer: Howe & Howe Technologies
- Manufacturer: Textron Systems
- Unit cost: US$295,000 (civilian variant)
- Produced: 2009–present
- Variants: MS1 (unmanned); MS2 (driver optional)

Specifications
- Mass: 9,000 lb (4,100 kg)
- Height: 70 in (180 cm)
- Crew: Up to 2 in manned variants
- Armor: None (aluminum frame)
- Engine: Duramax V8 engine 750 hp (760 PS; 560 kW)
- Payload capacity: 2,000 lb (910 kg)
- Suspension: 16 in (410 mm) travel
- Ground clearance: 24 in (610 mm)
- Maximum speed: 65 mph (105 km/h)

The Ripsaw is a series of developmental unmanned ground combat vehicles designed by Howe & Howe Technologies (now part of Textron Systems) for evaluation by the United States Army.

The Howe brothers started the Ripsaw as a small family project in 2000. They introduced it at a Dallas vehicle show in 2001, where it caught the interest of the U.S. Army. Later that year the U.S. military ordered a prototype MS-1 to be made and shipped to Iraq.

The Ripsaw is intended to perform various missions including convoy protection, perimeter defense, surveillance, rescue, border patrol, crowd control, and explosive ordnance disposal. For perimeter defense or crowd control, a belt of M5 crowd control munitions (MCCM) can be mounted around the vehicle to break up crowds or engage personnel with less-lethal flash-bang effects and rubber bullets. Cameras provide 360-degree coverage for situational awareness for the operator.

The Army has tested the Ripsaw while remote-controlled by a soldier in another armored vehicle up to 1 km (0.62 mi) away. Its weapon system is modified to fire remotely using the Advanced Remote Armament System (ARAS), a gun that loads its own ammunition and can swap out various types of ammunition, such as lethal and less-lethal, in just a few seconds. These capabilities allow manned vehicles to send the Ripsaw out in front of them and engage targets without exposing soldiers to threats. As of March 2017, the Army was still testing the vehicle as an unmanned platform to test remote controlled weapon stations.

In October 2019, Textron and Howe & Howe unveiled their Ripsaw M5 vehicle, and on 9 January 2020, the U.S. Army awarded them a contract for the Robotic Combat Vehicle-Medium (RCV-M) program. Four Ripsaw M5 prototypes were to be delivered and used in a company-level to determine the feasibility of integrating unmanned vehicles into ground combat operations in late 2021. It can reach speeds of more than 40 mph (64 km/h), has a combat weight of 10.5 tons and a payload capacity of 8,000 lb (3,600 kg). The RCV-M is armed with a Mk44 Bushmaster II and a pair of anti-tank guided missiles. The standard armor package can withstand 12.7×108mm rounds, with optional add-on armor increasing weight to up to 20 tons. If disabled, it will retain the ability to shoot, with its sensors and radio uplink prioritized to continue transmitting as its primary function. The Ripsaw was reported to have selected to continue with the RCV program, but development was stopped in May 2025.

== Variants ==
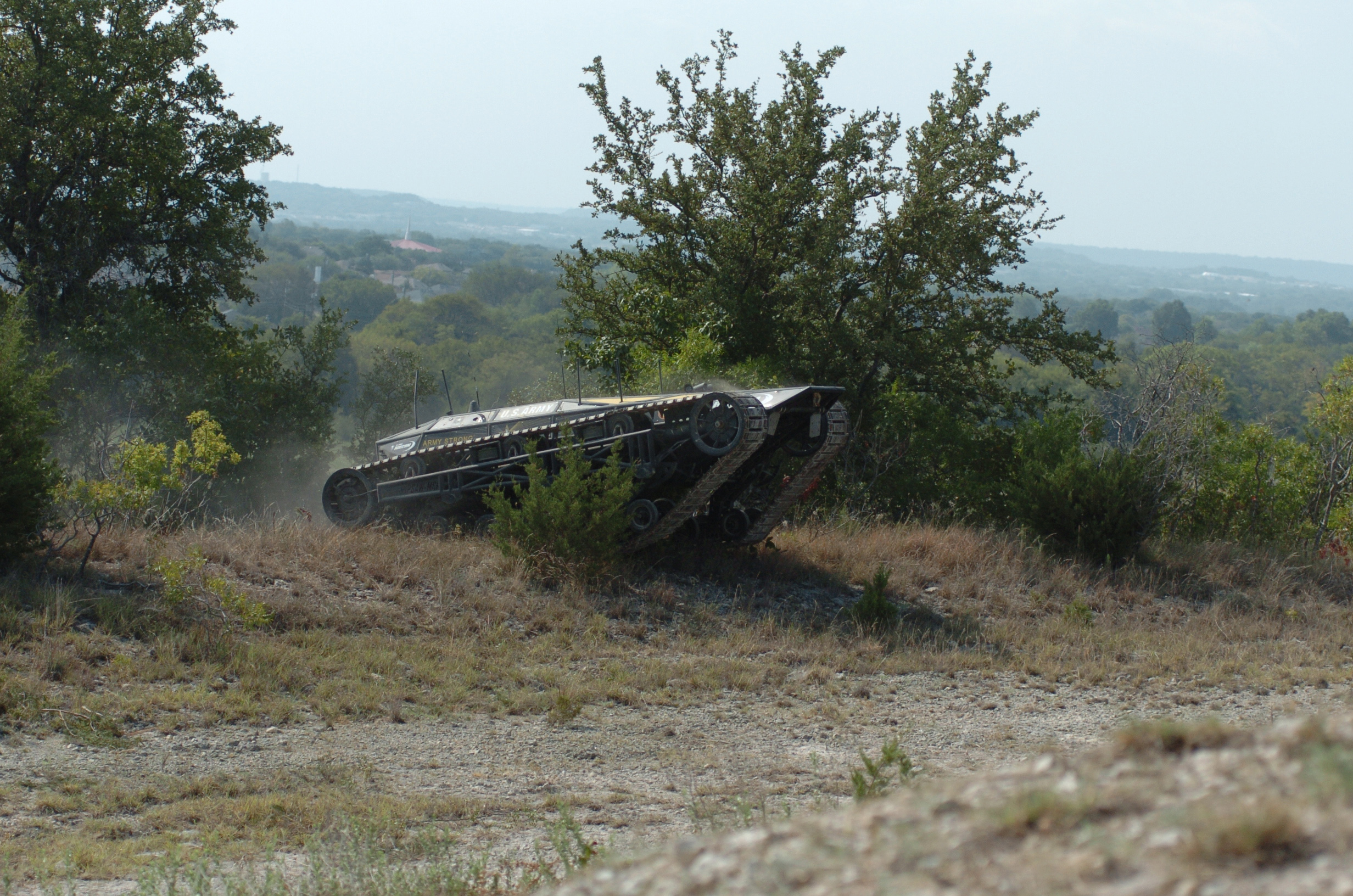
- An early Ripsaw MS1 at Fort Hood in 2009
  Ripsaw UGV (non-militarized) prototype could accelerate to 65 mph (105 km/h) in about 3.5 seconds.
- Ripsaw MS1 tactical UGV utilized a powerful oversized and customized 600-horsepower (610 PS; 450 kW) Duramax 6.6L V8 diesel engine that delivers 900 ft⋅lbf (1,200 N⋅m) of torque. The Ripsaw MS1 was a test platform made to test off-road capabilities. It was exclusively unmanned, cost $200,000 and could accelerate from 0–65 mph (0–105 km/h) in 3 seconds.
- Ripsaw MS2 UGV is made to be larger, faster, and more modular than the MS1. It weighs 4.5 short tons (4.1 t) and can carry a one-short-ton (0.91 t) payload. The lightweight tubular chassis design is powered by a 6.6 liter Duramax diesel engine generating 600 horsepower (610 PS; 450 kW) and 1,000 ft⋅lbf (1,400 N⋅m) of torque. Fully loaded, the MS2 can accelerate from 0–50 mph (0–80 km/h) in 5.5 seconds and has a top speed of 60 mph (97 km/h). The vehicle can traverse 50-degree gradients and 45-degree slopes. It can be optionally manned or tele-operated from a nearby command vehicle. Armament can include an M240 machine gun or M2 .50-caliber machine gun, and it has been tested with the Javelin missile. If the Ripsaw is damaged or destroyed, parts can be "cannibalized" in the field and re-assembled quickly. An MS2 vehicle costs $750,000.
- Ripsaw MS3 UGV is being tested by United States Army Research, Development and Engineering Command under the Remote Armed Maneuver Platform (RAMP) initiative to integrate the M153 CROWS remote weapon system onto an unmanned vehicle. RAMP was demonstrated at Fort Benning, Georgia in October 2013 as part of the Army's Armed Unmanned Ground Vehicle (AUGV) program.
- Ripsaw EV2 is a luxury version, with a fully enclosed body and two seats inside the cab. It can reach speeds of over 60 mph (97 km/h) and has a range of approximately 300 miles (480 km). It is currently unknown if the EV2 can mount remotely operated weapon systems. This model is designed for the civilian market and costs $295,000 with customizable features.
- Ripsaw M5 is a fully autonomous, all-electric tank with a modular design and maximum speed of 60 mph (96 km/h).
- Ripsaw F4 is the latest civilian variant that will now allow four passengers, with a maximum speed of 55 mph.

== See also ==
- Black Knight (vehicle)
- Gladiator tactical unmanned ground vehicle
