= Unmanned ground vehicle =

Type of vehicle

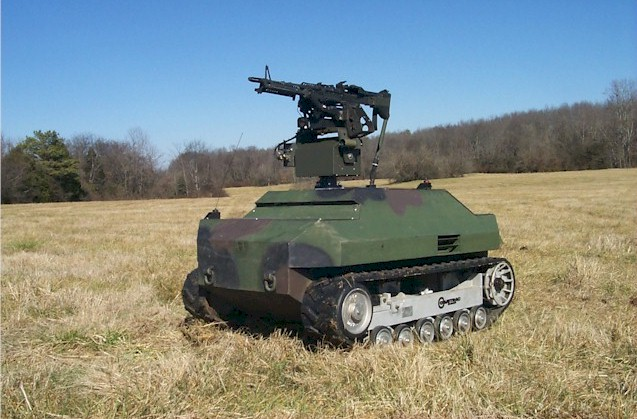
A Gladiator tactical unmanned ground vehicle

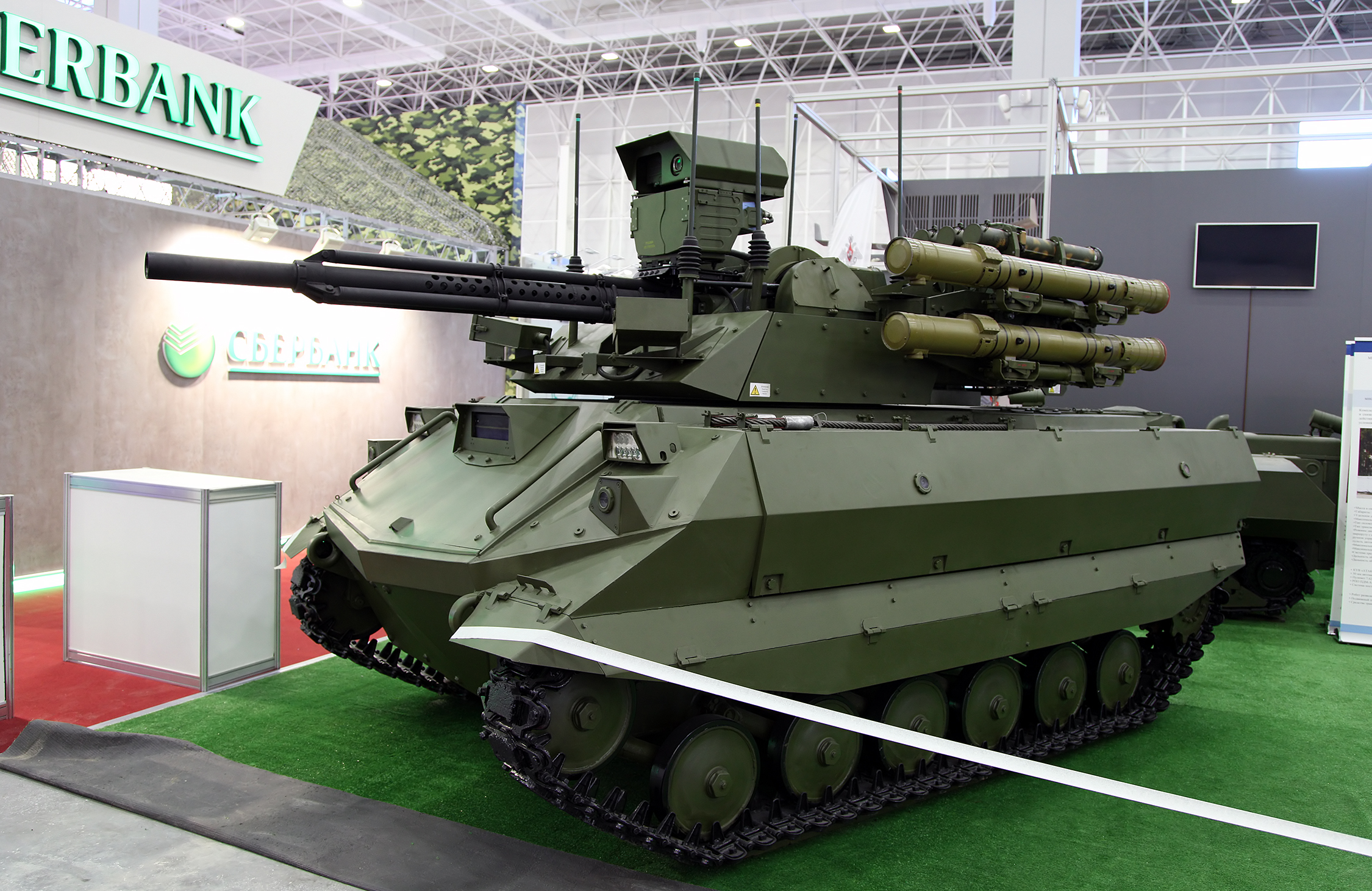
Uran-9 unmanned ground vehicle

An unmanned ground vehicle (UGV) also known colloquially as armored robot (ARB) is a vehicle that operates while in contact with the ground without an onboard human presence. UGVs can be used for many applications where it is inconvenient, dangerous, expensive, or impossible to use an onboard human operator. Typically, the vehicle has sensors to observe the environment, and autonomously controls its behavior or uses a remote human operator to control the vehicle via teleoperation.

The UGV is the land-based counterpart to unmanned aerial vehicles, unmanned underwater vehicles and unmanned surface vehicles. Unmanned robots are used in war and by civilians.

== History ==
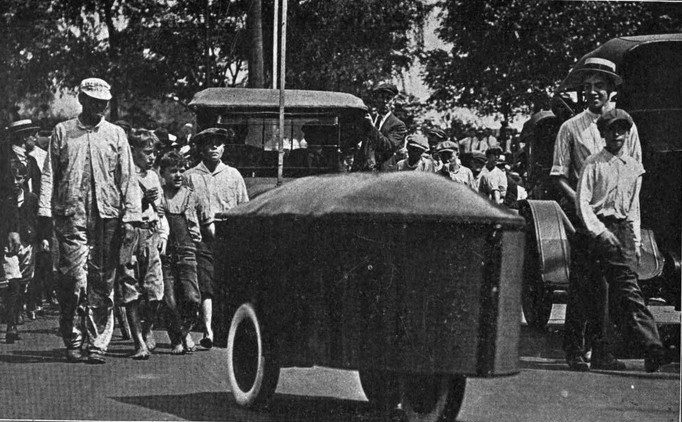
RCA radio controlled car. Dayton, Ohio, 1921

In 1904, Spanish engineer Leonardo Torres Quevedo was developing a radio-based control system, which he named Telekino. He chose to conduct an initial test in the form of a three-wheeled land vehicle (tricycle), which had an effective range of 20 to 30 meters, the first known example of an unmanned ground vehicle.

The first prototypes of explosive robotic drones were Aubriot-Gabet 'land torpedoes' invented in France in 1915 and the Crocodile Schneider-Creusot. Twenty examples were put into service with the 2nd French Army in July 1915.

A working remote-controlled car was reported in the October 1921 issue of RCA's World Wide Wireless magazine. The car was controlled wirelessly via radio; it was thought the technology could be adapted to tanks. In the 1930s, the USSR developed the Teletank, a small tank, armed with a machine gun. It was remotely controlled by radio from another tank. Teletanks operated in the Winter War (1939–1940) between Finland and the USSR and at the start of the German-Soviet War after Germany invaded the USSR in 1941. During World War II, the British developed a radio-controlled version of their Matilda II infantry tank in 1941. Known as "Black Prince", it would have been used for drawing fire from concealed anti-tank guns, or for demolition missions. Due to the costs of converting the transmission system of the tank to Wilson-type gearboxes, an order for 60 tanks was cancelled.

From 1942, the German Wehrmacht used the Goliath tracked mine for remote-controlled demolition work. The Goliath was a tracked vehicle carrying 60 kg of explosive charge, directed through a control cable. It modeled a miniature French tracked vehicle found after the German defeat of France in 1940. The combination of cost, low speed, reliance on a cable for control, and poor protection against weapons, meant that the Goliath was not considered a success.

The first major mobile robot development effort, named "Shakey", took place during the 1960s as a research study for the U.S. Defense Advanced Research Projects Agency (DARPA). Shakey was a wheeled platform that had a TV camera, sensors, and a computer to help guide its tasks of picking up wooden blocks and placing them in certain areas based on commands. DARPA subsequently developed a series of autonomous and semi-autonomous ground robots, often in conjunction with the U.S. Army. As part of the Strategic Computing Initiative of 1983–1993, DARPA c. 1985 demonstrated the Autonomous Land Vehicle, (ALV), the first UGV that could navigate completely autonomously on and off roads at useful speeds.

UGVs rose in significance after the full-scale Russian invasion of Ukraine and the dramatic rise in use of unmanned aerial vehicles. On March 29, 2024, as part of the Eastern Ukraine Campaign, a platoon of Russian UGVs equipped with AGS-17 automatic grenade launchers was deployed for an assault near the town of Berdychi in Ukraine, marking the first ever use of UGVs for direct frontline assaults.

During an undated operation, the 3rd Assault Brigade claimed the world's first surrender of enemy soldiers to unmanned drones in the Kharkiv Oblast. FPV and ground drones were used to attack the Russian positions. As more ground drones approached the position, the Russians opted to surrender. The Ukrainian ground drones then guided the Russians soldiers to the Ukrainian position where they surrendered. The press release read: "For the first time in history: Russian soldiers surrendered to the 3rd Assault Brigade's ground drones,".

On 22 December 2025, the 3rd Assault Brigade said that a Ukrainian UGV, a Droid TW 12.7 armed with a .50-caliber machine gun, held off Russian attacks for 45 days while being operated either remotely or using AI. The first time a position was held solely by an UGV without direct human support such as infantry.

In 2026 Operation Vivaldi saw large-scale use of UGVs as part of combined arms operations. The 3rd Army Corps used combined electronic warfare, air defense, aerial drones, and unmanned ground vehicles to take control of over 125 square kilomoters of land supported by conventional tanks and armoured vehicles in manoeuvre warfare. Heavy aerial drones were used to air-drop ground robots behind Russian lines while Russian reconnaissance capabilities were suppressed by air defence and electronic warfare units. According to Ukraine 80% of logistics and 90% of evacuations were carried out using UGVs and were used for both mine-clearing and minelaying.

On 6 November 2026, HUR tested the mounting of a flamethrower on a UGV.

== Design ==
UGVs generally include: a vehicle platform, sensors, control systems, guidance interface, communication links, and systems integration features.

=== Platform ===
The platform can be a car, truck, all-terrain vehicle, etc., and includes the locomotive apparatus, sensors, and power source. Tracks, wheels, and legs are common forms of locomotion. The platform may include an articulated body and may join with other units. Power sources can be internal combustion engines, batteries, or hydrogen.

=== Sensors ===
Sensors create a model of the environment, showing other vehicles, pedestrians, and obstacles. They also locate the vehicle on the navigation path. Sensors can include compasses, odometers, inclinometers, gyroscopes, cameras, laser and ultrasound rangefinders, GPS radios, and infrared technology.

=== Control systems ===
Unmanned ground vehicles are generally considered Remote-Operated or Autonomous, although Supervisory Control is a combination of autonomous and remote operation.

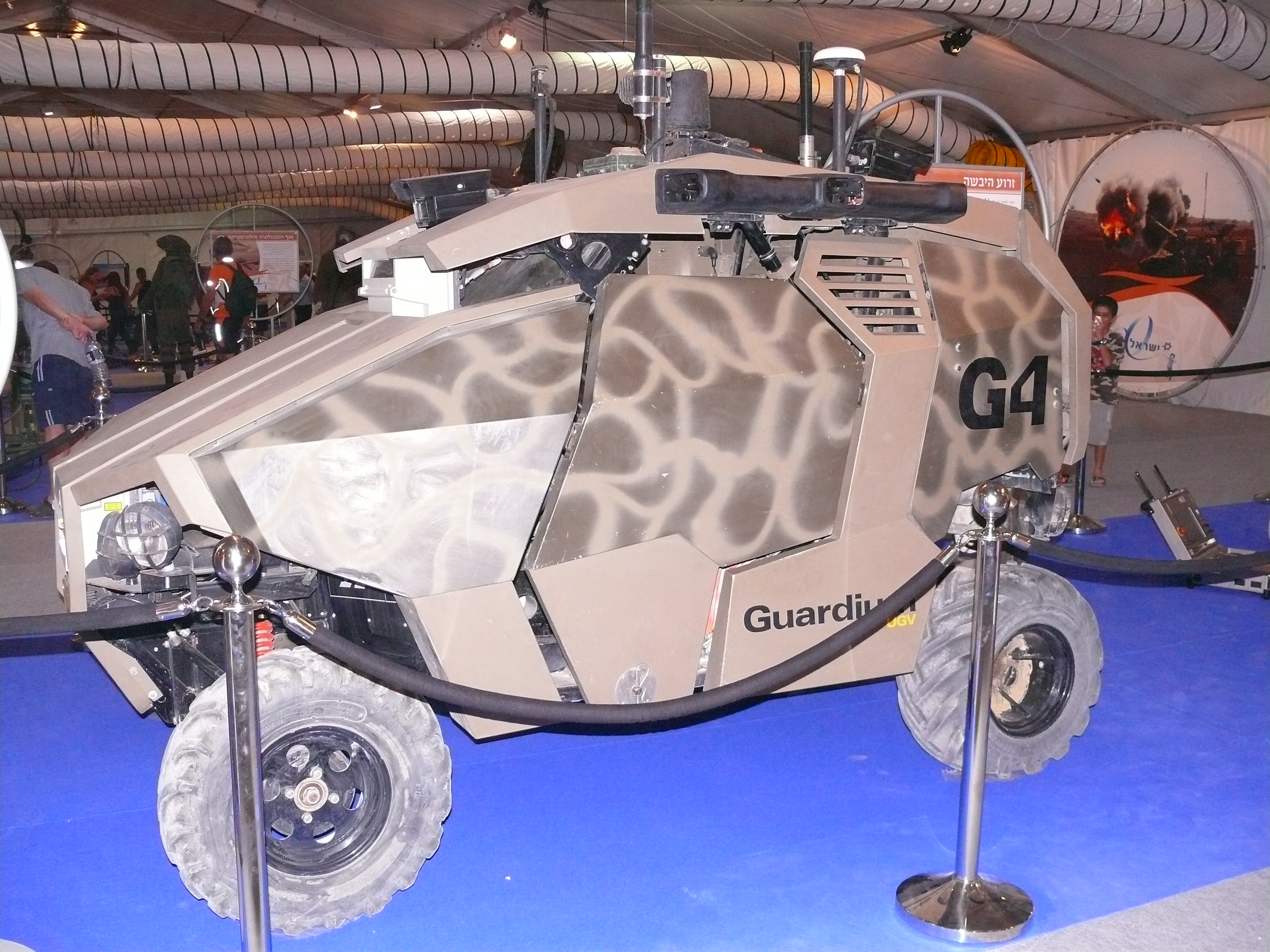
Guardium used by the Israel Defense Forces to operate as part of the border security operations

==== Remote operated ====
A remote-operated UGV is controlled by a human operator. The operator makes decisions based upon either direct visual observation or sensors such as cameras. A basic example of remote operation would be a remote-controlled toy car.

Examples:

- Autonomous Solutions
- BTR-90 "Krymsk" APC
- Clearpath Robotics
- DOK-ING mine clearing, firefighting, and underground mining UGVs
- DRDO Daksh
- Foster-Miller TALON
- Frontline Robotics Teleoperated UGV (TUGV)
- Gladiator tactical unmanned ground vehicle (used by the United States Marine Corps)
- G-NIUS Autonomous Unmanned Ground Vehicles (Israel Aerospace Industries/Elbit Systems joint venture) Guardium
- GROVER – Goddard remotely operated vehicle for exploration and research
- Uran-9
- iRobot PackBot
- MacroUSA Armadillo V2 Micro UGV (MUGV) and Scorpion SUGV
- Mesa Associates Tactical Integrated Light-Force Deployment Assembly (MATILDA)
- Nerekhta UGV, appeared at Zapad 2021 during Belarus-Russia exercise
- Nova 5
- Remotec ANDROS F6A
- Ripsaw MS1
- Robowatch ASENDRO
- Unmanned Snatch Land Rover.
- THeMIS used by the Royal Netherlands Army and developed by Milrem Robotics
- Unmanned ground vehicle Miloš used by Serbian Armed Forces
- Vecna Robotics Battlefield Extraction-Assist Robot (BEAR)
- VIPeR

==== Autonomous ====
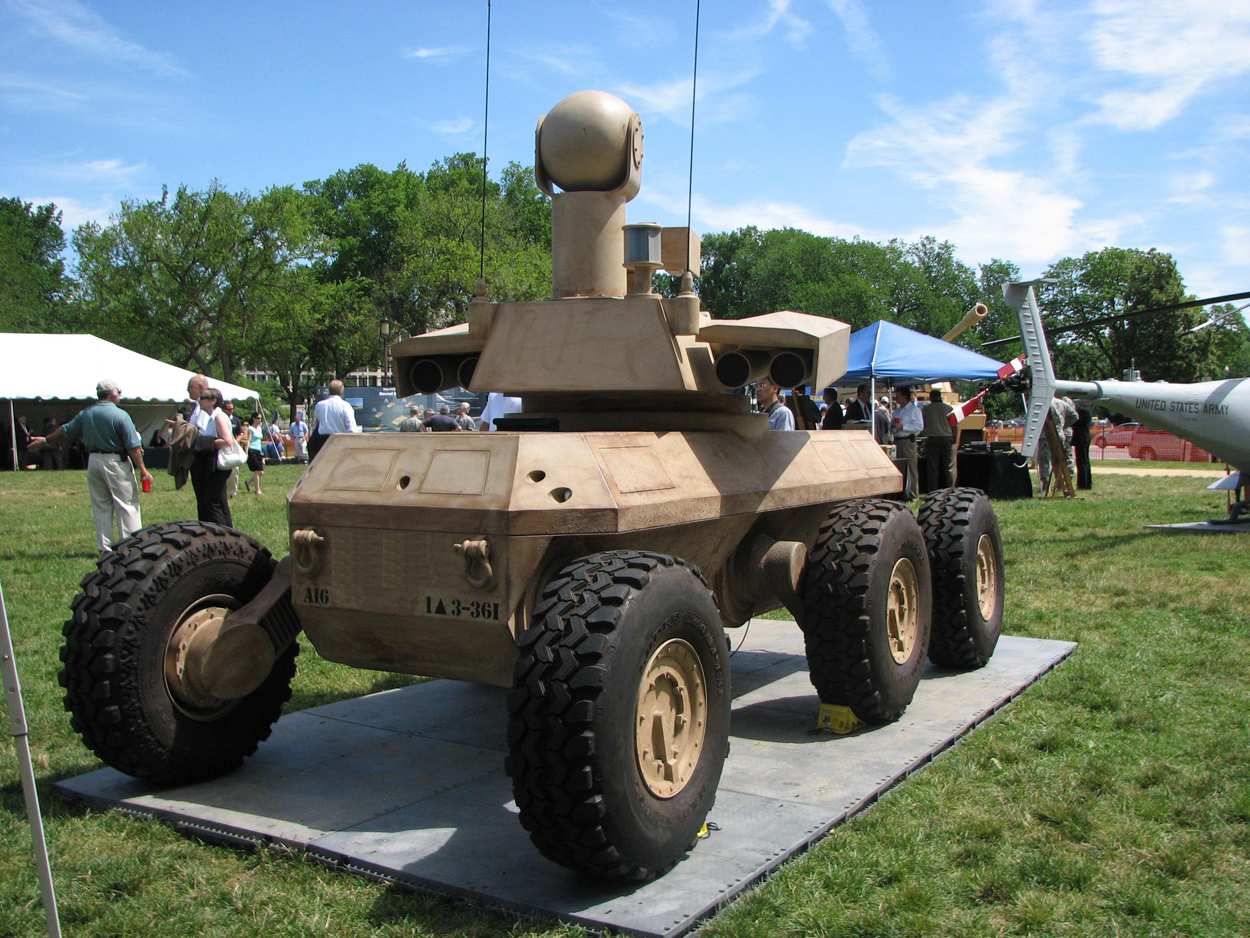
A US Army XM1219 armed robotic vehicle. Canceled in 2011.

An autonomous UGV (AGV) is an autonomous robot that replaces the human controller with artificial intelligence technologies. The vehicle uses sensors to feed a model of the environment, which supports a control system that determines the next action. This eliminates the need for humans to watch over the vehicle.

An autonomous vehicle must have the ability to:

- Navigate based on maps that allow the vehicle to pick a route from origin to destination.
- Detect objects such as people and vehicles.
- Travel between waypoints without human assistance.
- Avoid harming people, property or itself, unless those are part of its mission.

A robot may also be able to learn autonomously. Autonomous learning includes the ability to:

- Gain capabilities.
- Adjust strategies based on the surroundings.
- Adapt to surroundings.
- Behave ethically in pursuit of mission goals.

Armed autonomous machines must distinguish between combatants and civilians. This is particularly true in conflicts where combatants intentionally disguise themselves as civilians to avoid detection. Even highly accurate but imperfect systems can pose unacceptable civilian losses.

=== Guidance interface ===
The interface between the machine and the human operator can include a joystick, autonomous software, or voice commands.

=== Communication links ===
Communication between UGV and control station can be done via radio or fiber optics. It may include communication with other machines and robots.

=== Systems integration ===
The various hardware and software elements must work together to produce desired results.

== Uses ==
A wide variety of UGVs were in use as of 2025. They typically replace humans in hazardous situations, such as handling explosives and in bomb disabling vehicles, where additional strength or smaller size is needed, or where humans cannot safely go. Military applications include surveillance, reconnaissance, and target acquisition. They are used in industries such as agriculture, mining, and construction. UGVs are effective in naval operations, and for the Marine Corps in combat; they can help in logistics operations on land and sea.

UGVs are under development for peacekeeping operations, ground surveillance, gatekeeper/checkpoint operations, urban street presence and to enhance police and military raids in urban settings. UGVs can "draw first fire" from adversaries—reducing military and police casualties. Furthermore, UGVs are used in rescue and recovery mission and were used to find survivors following 9/11 at Ground Zero. In Hong Kong, the police and other workers use driverless vehicles.

=== Space ===
NASA's Mars Exploration Rover project included two UGVs, Spirit and Opportunity. Both performed beyond design parameters. This is attributed to redundant systems, careful handling, and long-term interface decision-making. Opportunity and its twin, Spirit, are six-wheeled, solar-powered ground vehicles. They were launched in July 2003 and landed on opposite sides of Mars in January 2004. Spirit operated nominally until it became trapped in deep sand in April 2009, lasting more than 20 times longer than expected. Opportunity was operational for more than 14 years beyond its intended lifespan of three months. Curiosity landed on Mars on 6 August 2012, and its original two-year mission has since been extended until October 2025 (4,804 days longer than expected).

=== Civilian and commercial ===
Civilian applications are automating processes in manufacturing environments. They work as autonomous tour guides for the Carnegie Museum of Natural History and the Swiss National Exhibition Expo.

==== Agriculture ====
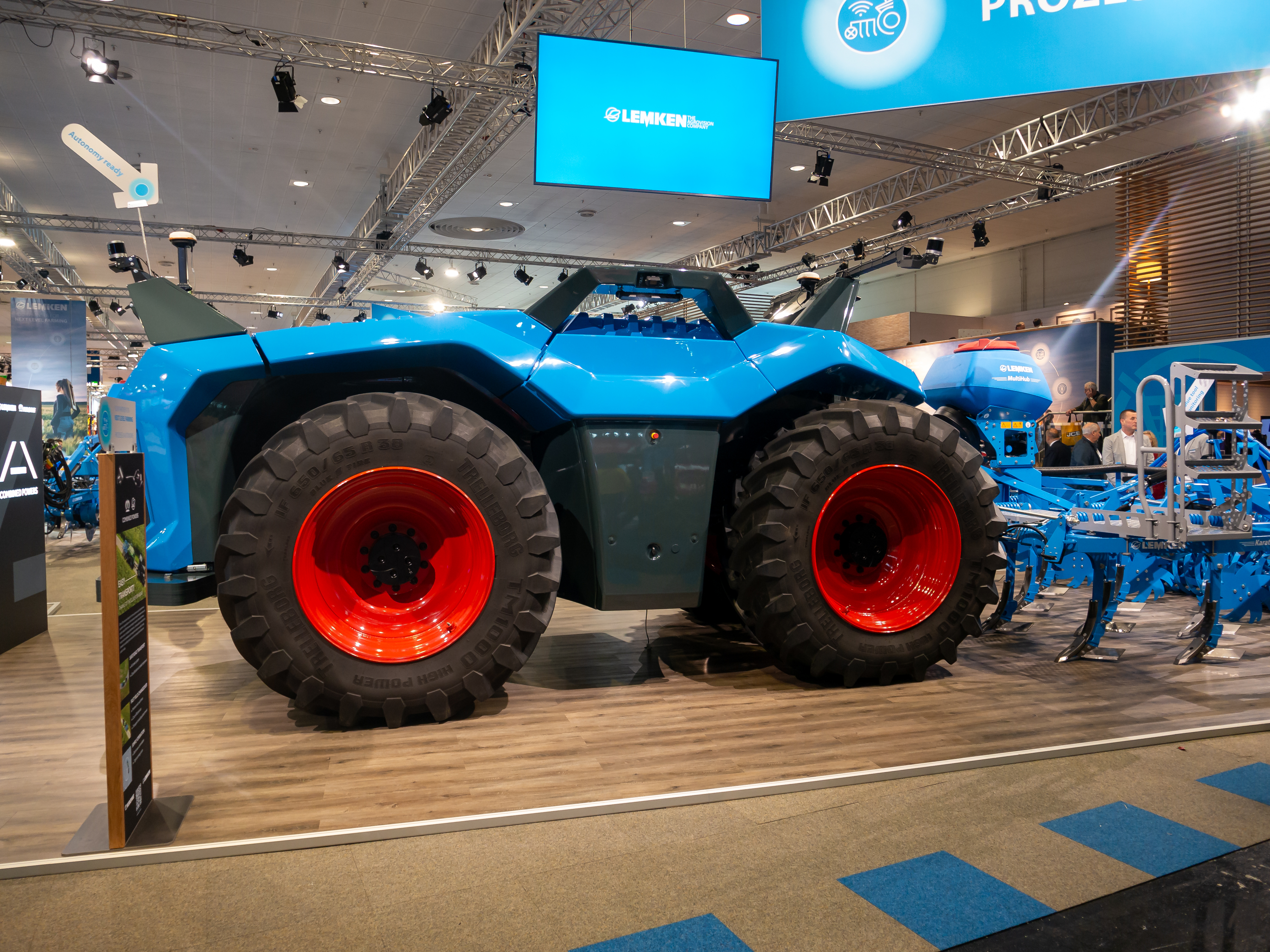
Autonomous tractor by Krone

UGVs are one type of agricultural robot. Unmanned tractors can operate around the clock, to meet short windows for harvesting. UGVs are used for spraying and thinning. They can be used to monitor crop and livestock health.

==== Manufacturing ====
In the manufacturing environment, UGVs are used for transporting materials. Aerospace companies use these vehicles for precision positioning and transporting heavy, bulky components between manufacturing stations, which is faster than using large cranes and can keep people out of dangerous areas.

==== Mining ====
UGVs can be used to traverse and map mine tunnels. Combining radar, laser, and visual sensors, UGVs are in development to map 3D rock surfaces in open pit mines.

==== Supply chain ====
In the warehouse management system, UGVs have multiple uses from transferring goods with autonomous forklifts and conveyors to stock scanning and taking inventory. Automated Guided Vehicles are extensively used in warehouses to deal with goods that are dangerous to humans (e.g. corrosive and flammable goods) or need special handling such as passing through freezers.

=== Emergency response ===
UGVs are used in many emergency situations including urban search and rescue, firefighting, and nuclear response. Following the 2011 Fukushima Daiichi Nuclear Power Plant accident, UGVs were used in Japan for mapping and structural assessment in areas with too much radiation to allow a human presence.

=== Military ===
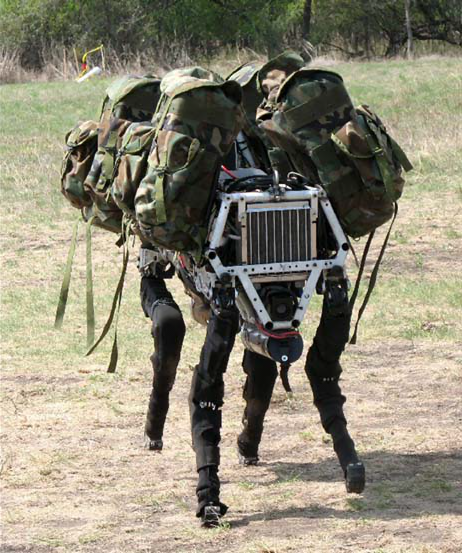
BigDog, a quadruped robot, was being developed as a mule that can traverse difficult terrain.

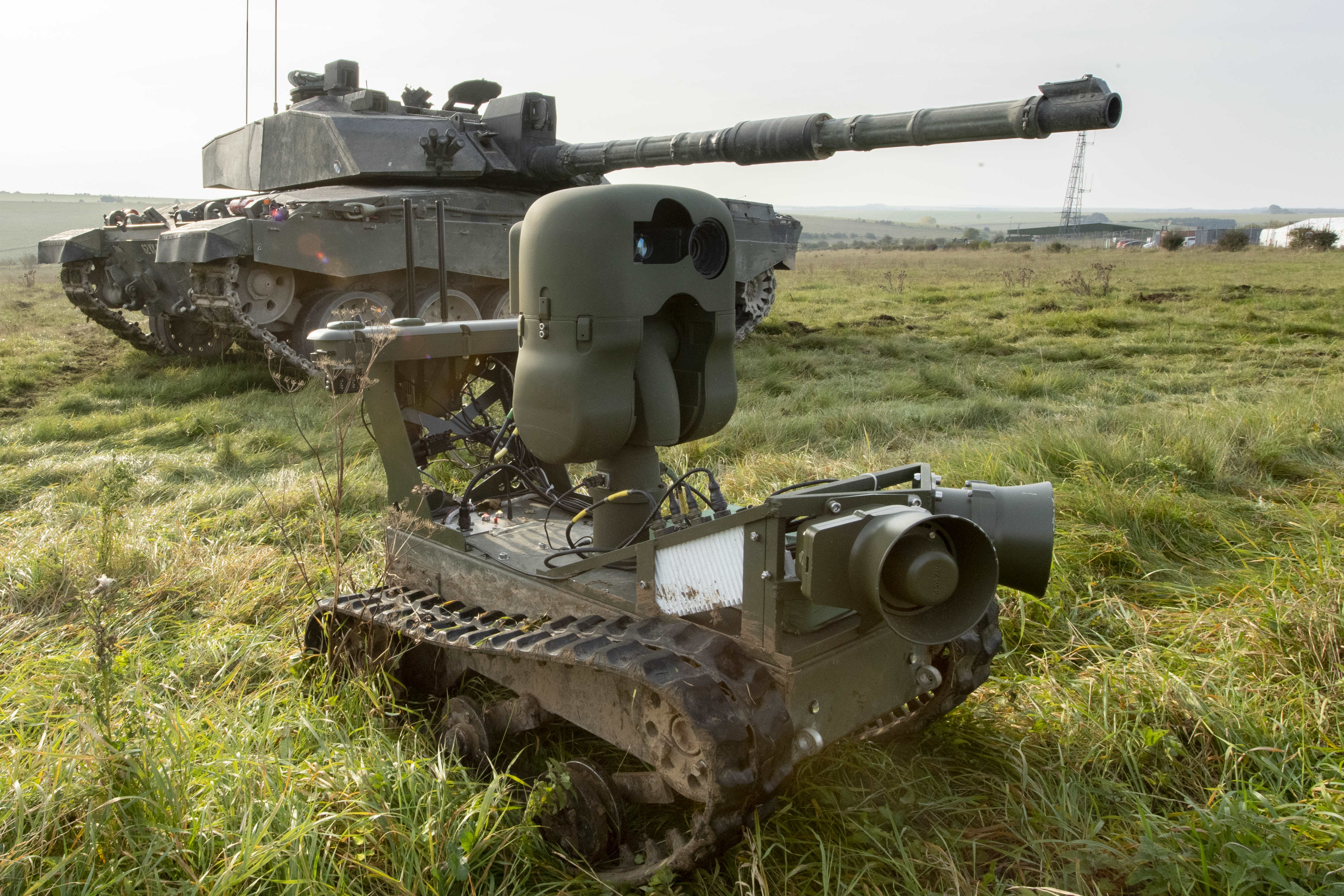
British Army trials of X-2 with existing systems in 2020

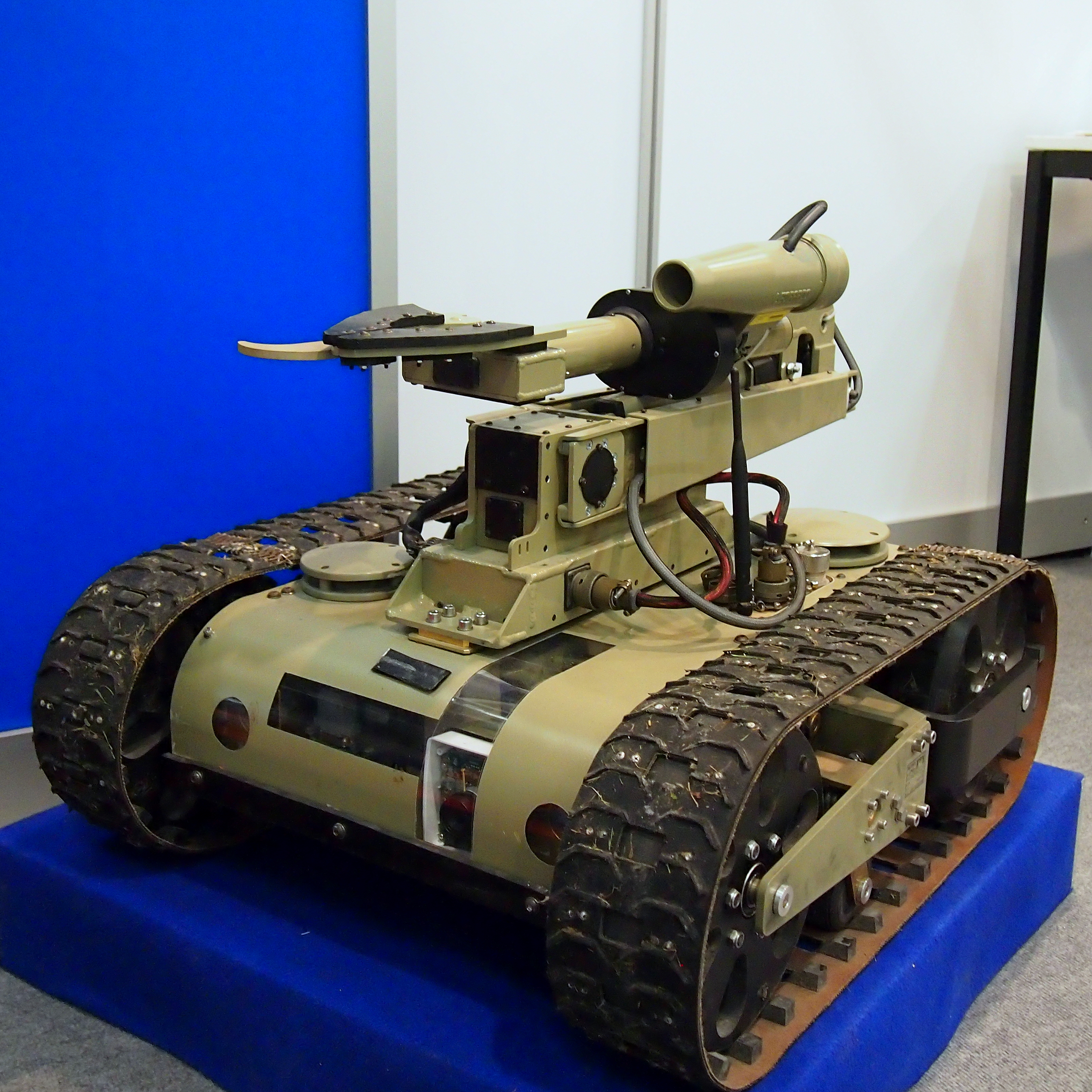
EuroLink Systems Leopardo B

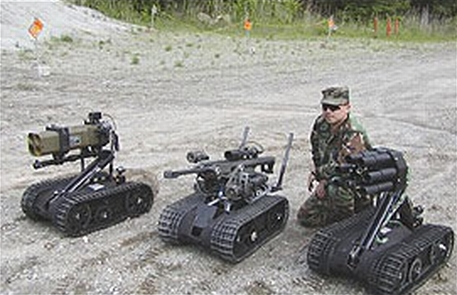
Foster-Miller TALON SWORDS units equipped with various weaponry

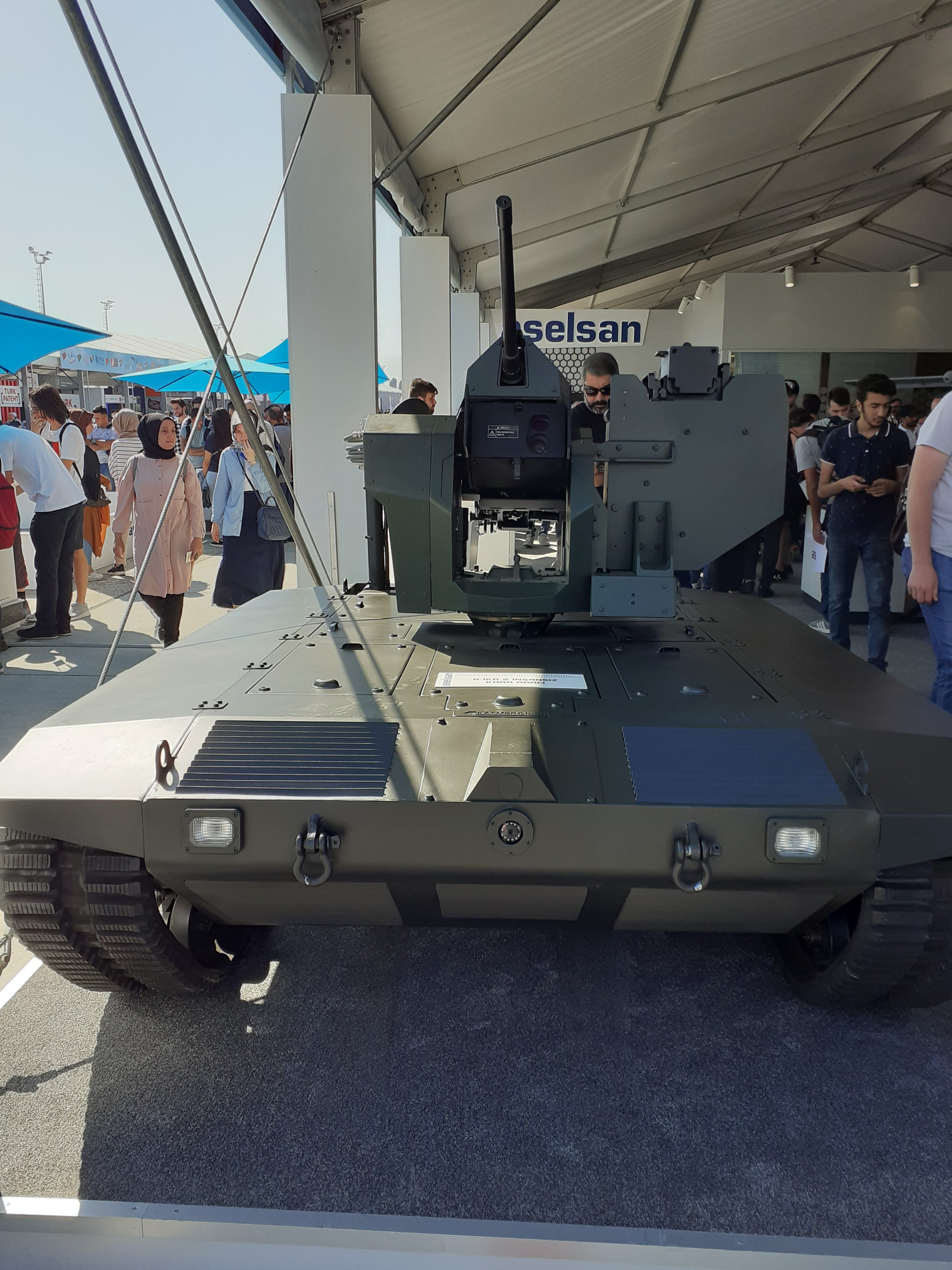
Turkey's unmanned ground vehicle UKAP

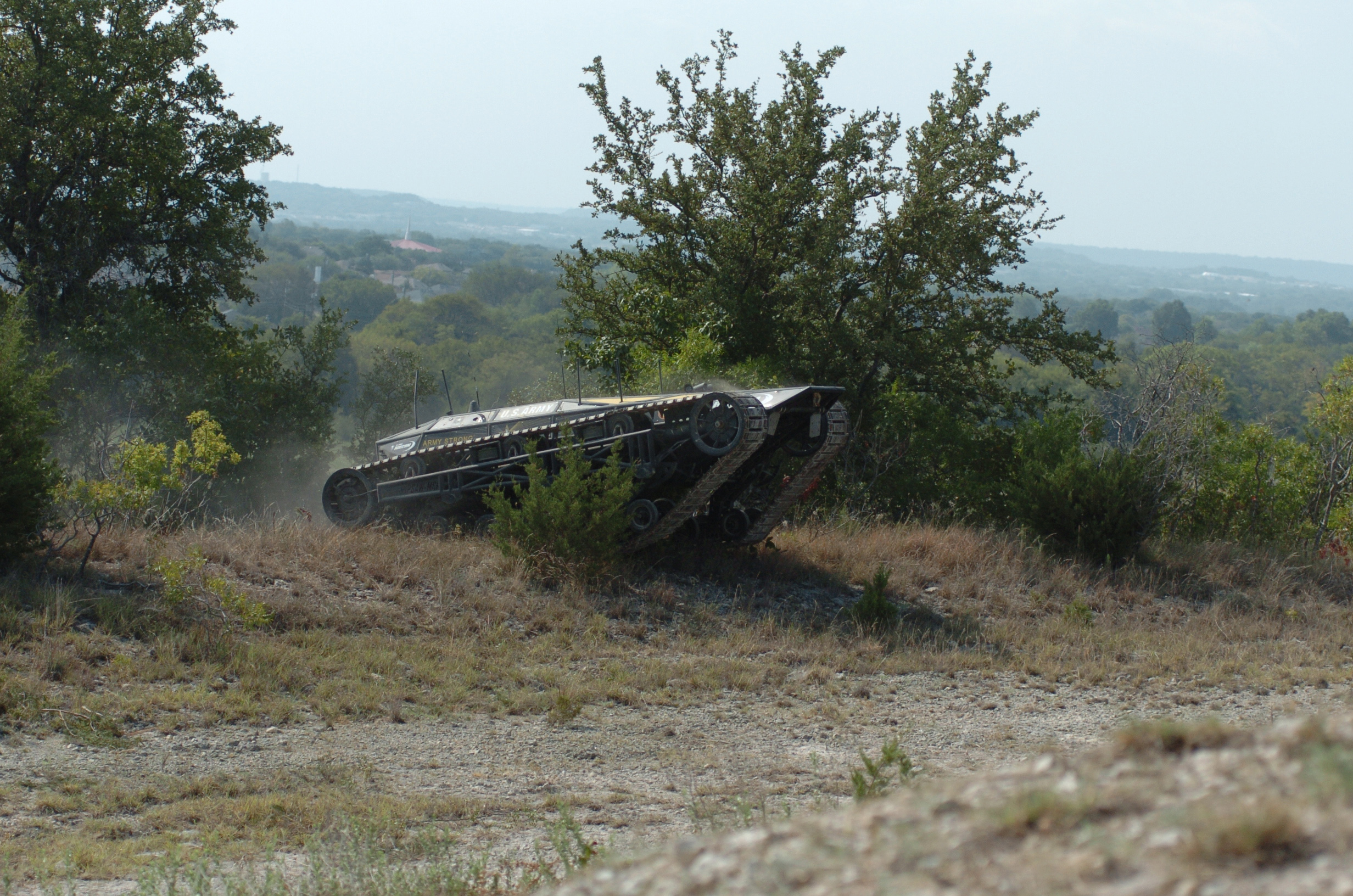
Ripsaw, a developmental combat UGV designed and built by Howe & Howe Technologies for evaluation by the United States Army

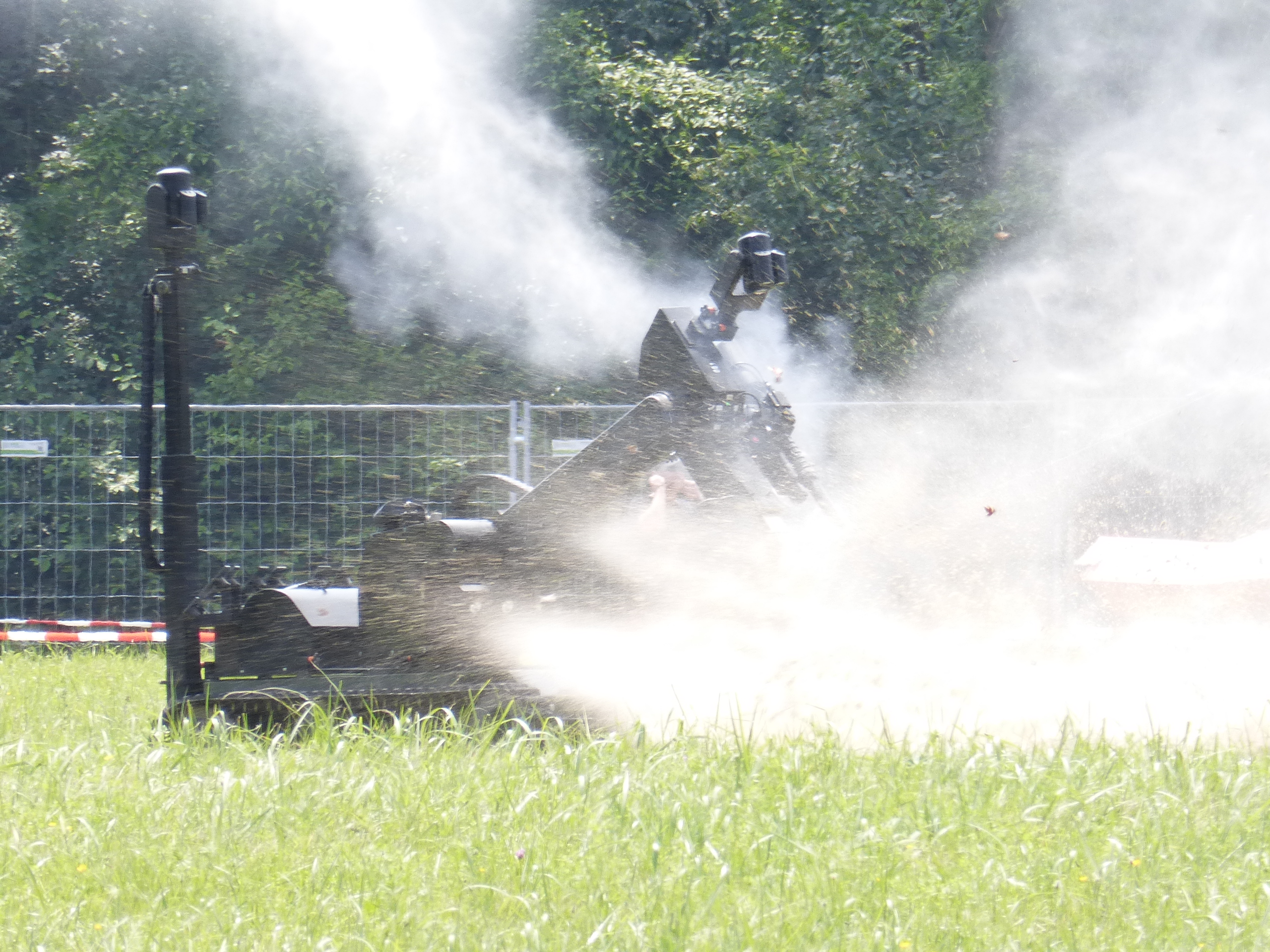
"tEODor" robot of the German Army destroying a fake IED

UGV use by the military has saved many lives. Applications include explosive ordnance disposal (EOD) such as landmines, loading heavy items, and repairing ground conditions under enemy fire. The number of robots used in Iraq increased from 150 in 2004 to 5000 in 2005 where they disarmed over 1000 roadside bombs in Iraq at the end of 2005. By 2013, the U.S. Army had purchased 7,000 such machines and 750 had been destroyed. The U.S. military is building UGVs to act as armed robots outfitted with machine guns and grenade launchers that may replace soldiers in combat. Such uses potentially pose ethical concerns by removing humans from the OODA loop.

Another widespread application of UGVs gaining popularity is for CASEVAC. During the full-scale Russo-Ukrainian War, some Ukrainian units such as the 13th Khartiia Brigade, 118th Mechanized Brigade, and 1st Separate Medical Battalion have started effectively using UGVs to evacuate wounded soldiers from the gray zone - sometimes under drone or artillery fire - for long distances of up to 34 kilometres (21 mi).

=== Examples ===
==== SARGE ====
SARGE is a 4-wheel drive all-terrain vehicle that uses the frame of the Yamaha Breeze. The objective is to provide each infantry battalion with up to eight SARGE units. SARGE is primarily used for remote surveillance; sent ahead of the infantry to investigate potential ambushes.

==== Multi-Utility Tactical Transport ====
Built by General Dynamics Land Systems, the Multi-Utility Tactical Transport ("MUTT") comes in 4-, 6- and 8-wheeled variants. It was tested by the US Marine Corps in July 2016 and was selected for the US Army's Squad Multipurpose Equipment Transport (SMET) unmanned ground system requirement in November 2019. GDLS signed a $162.4m contract to deliver 624 UGVs through October 2024.

==== X-2 ====
X-2 is a medium-sized tracked UGV built by Digital Concepts Engineering. It is based on a previous autonomous robotic system designed for use in EOD, search and rescue (SAR), perimeter patrol, communications relay, mine detection and clearing, and as a light weapons platform. It measures 1.31 m in length, weighs 300 kg and can reach speeds of 5 km/h. It traverses slopes up to 45' steep and crosses deep mud. The vehicle is controlled using the Marionette system which is also used on Wheelbarrow EOD robots.

==== The Warrior ====
The Warrior is a new model of the PackBot, but over five times its size. It can travel at speeds of up to 15 mph, and is the first PackBot capable of carrying a weapon. Like the Packbot, it plays a key role in checking for explosives. They are capable of carrying 68 kilograms and travelling at 8 mph.

==== TerraMax ====
TerraMax is designed to be integrated into any tactical wheeled vehicle and is fully incorporated into the brakes, steering, engine, and transmission. Fitted vehicles retain the ability to be driver-operated. Vehicles manufactured by Oshkosh Defense and fitted with the package competed in the DARPA Grand Challenges of 2004 and 2005, and the DARPA Urban Challenge of 2007. The Marine Corps Warfighting Lab selected TerraMax-equipped MTVRs for the Cargo UGV project initiated in 2010, culminating in a technology concept demonstration for the Office of Naval Research in 2015. Demonstrated uses for the upgraded vehicles include unmanned route clearance (with a mine roller) and reducing personnel required for transportation convoys.

==== THeMIS ====
THeMIS (Tracked Hybrid Modular Infantry System) is a ground-based armed drone vehicle designed largely for military applications. It is built by Milrem Robotics in Estonia. The vehicle's open architecture gives it multi-mission capability. Its main purpose is to increase situational awareness, provide improved intelligence, surveillance, and reconnaissance over wide areas, support on-base logistics, provide last-mile resupply for frontline units, and aid battle damage assessment. The vehicle serves as a transport platform, remote weapon station, IED detection and disposal unit, etc. It reduces physical and cognitive load, increases standoff distance, force protection, and survivability.

THeMIS Combat UGV includes an integrated self-stabilizing remote-controlled weapon system that provides direct fire support for manoeuvre forces. The weapons system provides high precision over wide areas, day and night, increasing standoff distance, force protection, and survivability. They can be equipped with light or heavy machine guns, 40 mm grenade launchers, 30 mm autocannons, and Anti-Tank Missile Systems.

THeMIS ISR UGVs have multi-sensor intelligence gathering capabilities. The system can aid dismounted infantry units, border guard, and law enforcement agencies to collect and process raw information and decrease the reaction time for commanders.

==== Type-X ====
The Type-X is a 12-tonne tracked and armored robotic combat vehicle designed and produced by Milrem Robotics in Estonia. Measuring 600 cm long, 290 cm wide, and 220 cm tall, this heavy-duty vehicle weighs in at 12,000 kg and can carry a maximum payload of 4,100 kg. It can be fitted with either autocannon turrets up to 50 mm or various other weapons systems, such as ATGMs, SAMs, radars, mortars, etc.

==== Talon ====
The Talon is primarily used for bomb disposal, and is waterproof at 100 ft depth so that it can search for explosives underwater. The Talon was first used in 2000, and over 3,000 units have been distributed worldwide. By 2004, The Talon had been used in over 20,000 separate missions. These missions largely consisted of situations that were considered to be too dangerous for humans. These can include entering booby-trapped caves, searching for IEDs, or scouting a combat zone. The Talon can keep pace with a running soldier. It can operate for 7 days off of one battery charge and is capable of climbing stairs. It was used at Ground Zero during the recovery mission. Talon's durability is attested by one unit that fell off a bridge into a river; the operators turned the control unit back on and drove it out of the river.

==== SWORDS ====
SWORDS is a Talon robot with an attached weapon system. Shortly after the release of the Warrior, the SWORDS robot was designed and deployed. SWORDS is capable of mounting any weapon system weighing less than 300 pounds. In a matter of seconds, the user can fit weapons such as a grenade launcher, rocket launcher, or 50 caliber machine gun. SWORDS fire with high precision, hitting the bullseye of a target 70/70 times in one test. They are capable of withstanding damage such as multiple 50 caliber rounds, or a fall from a helicopter onto concrete. In addition, the SWORDS robot is capable of making its way through difficult terrain, including underwater. In 2004, only four SWORDS units were in existence. It was named as one of the world's most amazing inventions by Time Magazine in 2004. The US Army deployed three to Iraq in 2007 but then cancelled support of the project.

==== Small Unit Mobility Enhancement Technology (SUMET) ====
The SUMET system is a platform and hardware independent, low-cost electro-optical perception, localization, and autonomy package developed to convert a traditional vehicle into a UGV. It performs various autonomous maneuvers in austere/harsh off-road environments, without dependence on a human operator or on GPS. The SUMET system has been deployed on various tactical and commercial platforms and is open, modular, scalable and extensible.

==== Autonomous Small Scale Construction Machine (ASSCM) ====
The ASSCM is a civilian unmanned ground vehicle developed in Yuzuncu Yil University via a grant from TUBITAK (Project code 110M396). The vehicle is a low-cost small scale construction machine that can grade soft soil. The machine is capable of autonomous grading within a polygon once the polygon border is defined. The machine determines its position by CP-DGPS and direction by consecutive position measurements.

==== Taifun-M ====
In April 2014, the Russian Army unveiled Taifun-M UGV as a remote sentry to guard RS-24 Yars and RT-2PM2 Topol-M missile sites. The Taifun-M features laser targeting and a cannon to carry out reconnaissance and patrol, detect and destroy stationary or moving targets, and provide fire support for security personnel. They are remotely operated.

==== UKAP ====
Turkey's unmanned ground vehicle Weapon Platform (UKAP) was developed by defense contractors Katmerciler and ASELSAN. The vehicle is equipped with the 12.7 mm SARP remote-controlled, stabilized weapon systems.

==== Ripsaw ====
The Ripsaw is a developmental unmanned ground combat vehicle designed and built by Howe & Howe Technologies for evaluation by the United States Army.

==== Riderless bike ====
The coModule electric bicycle is remotely operated via smartphone, with users able to accelerate, turn and brake the bike by tilting their device. The bike can drive autonomously in a closed environment.

== See also ==
- 4D-RCS Reference Model Architecture
- Autonomous logistics
- Automated guideway transit
- Black Knight (vehicle)
- Burrowing vehicle
- Crusher
- DARPA LAGR Program
- Driverless tractor
- Goliath tracked mine
- MillenWorks
- Multifunctional Utility/Logistics and Equipment
- Remotely operated underwater vehicle
- Self-driving car
- Unmanned aerial vehicle
- UGV Interoperability Profile (IOP), an official military standard for UGVs based on JAUS
- Vehicular automation
- VisLab, preparing their unique VIAC challenge (driving from Italy to China with autonomous vehicles)
- Software Defined Vehicle (SDV)
