= Nova 5 =

Nova 5 being demonstrated at a military exercise

Nova 5 is an autonomous robot designed for intelligent search and rescue applications created by two electronics engineers and brothers Fady and Sami Khaled. Unlike remote-controlled robots, Nova 5 uses artificial intelligence to interpret its surroundings, process the information and then navigate independently. It operates via a built-in fuzzy neural network which mimics the function of the human brain’s neurons.

== Description ==
The robot is approximately 68 cm wide and 70 cm in length and recognizes objects using on-board sensors, a camera and an advanced edge detection algorithm as well as a normalization algorithm. This mathematical algorithm is part of the on-board training model that detects and stores inputs while studying normal conditions.

== Operation ==
Utilizing electronic neurons, Nova 5 acquires data using a neural training model, stores the data and then uses the relevant data to make better decisions. This enables the robot to learn over time and use its past experiences for more accurate decisions. Nova 5 acquires input from its environment and reacts to those inputs without human intervention or control. It is used in sniffing and reconnaissance applications, therefore participating in life saving situations.

Nova 5 has the ability to detect human emotions using built-in facial recognition. It can also recognize noise and gasses in the surrounding environment such as hydrogen sulfide gas. It can also map an area and generate a 3D map of the area traversed. Nova 5 uses a communication system which operates via a 10 km wireless link and a radio link for enabling human control.

== See also ==
- Artificial intelligence
- Robot
- UGV
