= Uran-9 =

Russian unmanned ground combat vehicle

Uran-9 (Уран-9)
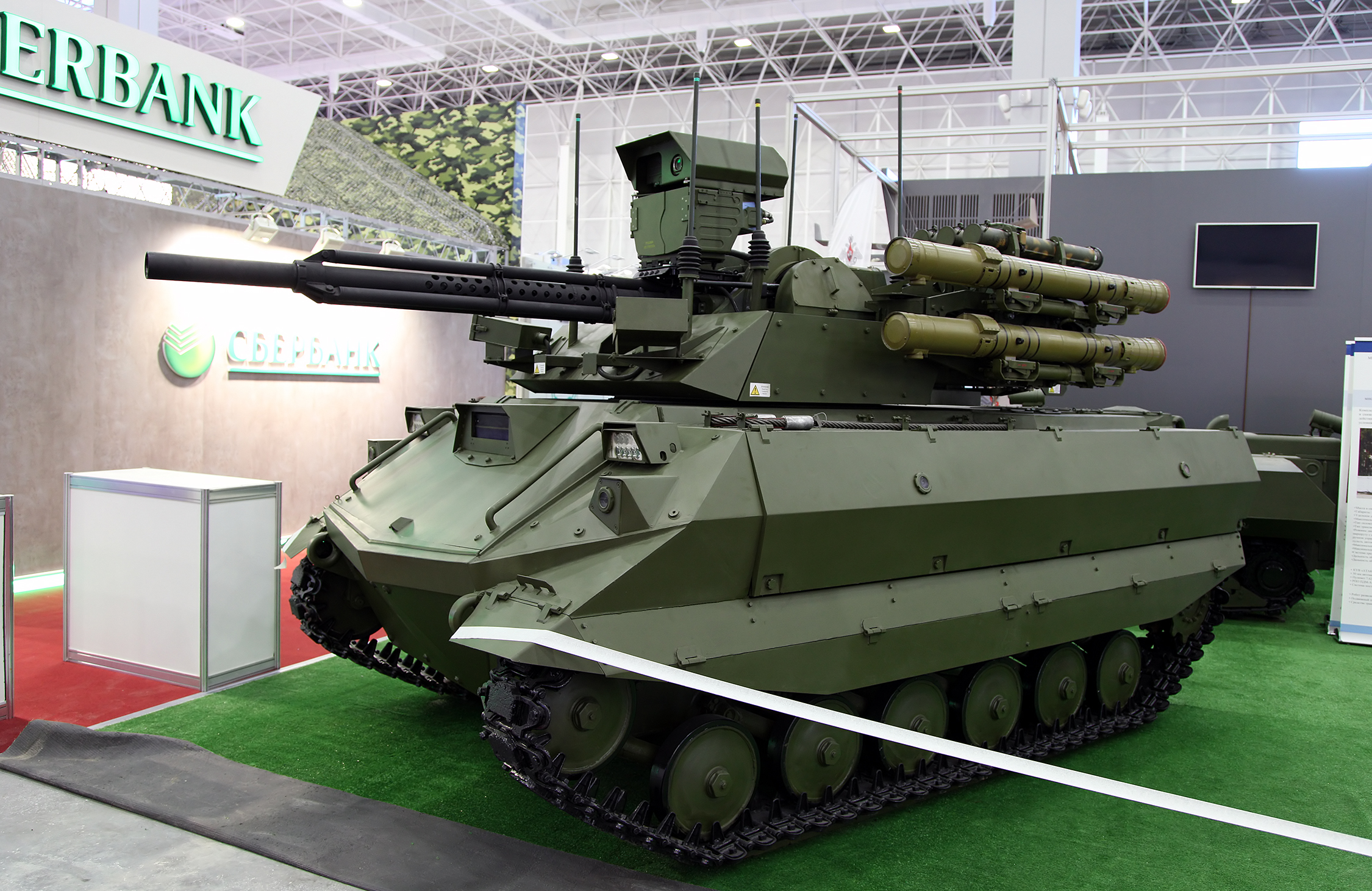
- Uran-9 combat unmanned ground vehicle - Military-technical forum ARMY-2016
- Type: Unmanned combat ground vehicle
- Place of origin: Russia

Service history
- In service: 2019–present
- Wars: Syrian civil war

Production history
- Designed: 2015
- Manufacturer: JSC 766 UPTK, Impul's 2 Sevastopol, Kalashnikov Concern
- Produced: 2015
- No. built: 342 (in mid-December 2022 after Putin announced military budgets boosters)

Specifications
- Crew: 1 (unmanned controller)
- Passengers: 0
- Main armament: 30 mm 2A72 autocannon ABM M30-M3 modification Shipunov 2A42
- Secondary armament: 1 × 7.62mm PKT/PKTM; 4 × 9M120 Ataka anti-tank missiles 6 (now 12) x Shmel-M thermobaric rocket launchers
- Engine: YaMZ 5347 or 9M82 TK Voskoye Izmil Uran; 420 HP
- Fuel capacity: 600 litres
- Operational range: 1,200 km (at 35 mph)
- Maximum speed: 70-133 km/h
- Guidance system: military AI systems guidance

The Uran-9 is a tracked unmanned combat ground vehicle (UCGV) developed and produced by JSC 766 UPTK (currently by Kalashnikov Concern), and promoted and offered by Rosoboronexport for the international market. According to a release by Rosoboronexport, the system is designed to deliver combined combat, reconnaissance and counter-terrorism units with remote reconnaissance and fire support.

The armament consists of a 2A72 mod ABM M30-M3 autocannon from Impul's 2 (Sevastopol') along Russian artillery and other producers, four ATGMs of the Ataka or other type, also Igla or Strela SAMs, FCS, cam IR sensors, laser rangefinder and other means for detection.

== Operational history ==
The Uran-9 was first deployed during the Syrian Civil War, though according to a performance report of the 3rd Central Research Institute of the Ministry of Defense of the Russian Federation, the tank functioned poorly, and was unable to perform many of the missions assigned to it. On the other hand, an industry source claimed that “the vehicle has been tested in Syria and demonstrated high performance in an operational environment,” also noting that industry is now working to increase the Uran-9's range, response time, and data bandwidth.

The Uran-9 was also used in the large-scale Vostok 2018 drills. The Uran-9 robotic armed vehicle entered military service in January 2019 and was first used in a defense exercise in August 2021. Uran-9 and Nerekhta reconnaissance and fire support robots were used in the regular ranks of formations for the first time during the Zapad-2021 drills.

Uran-9 vehicles took part in Russia's 9 May Victory Parade, in 2022; they were carried on the back of a truck, and sensors were missing.

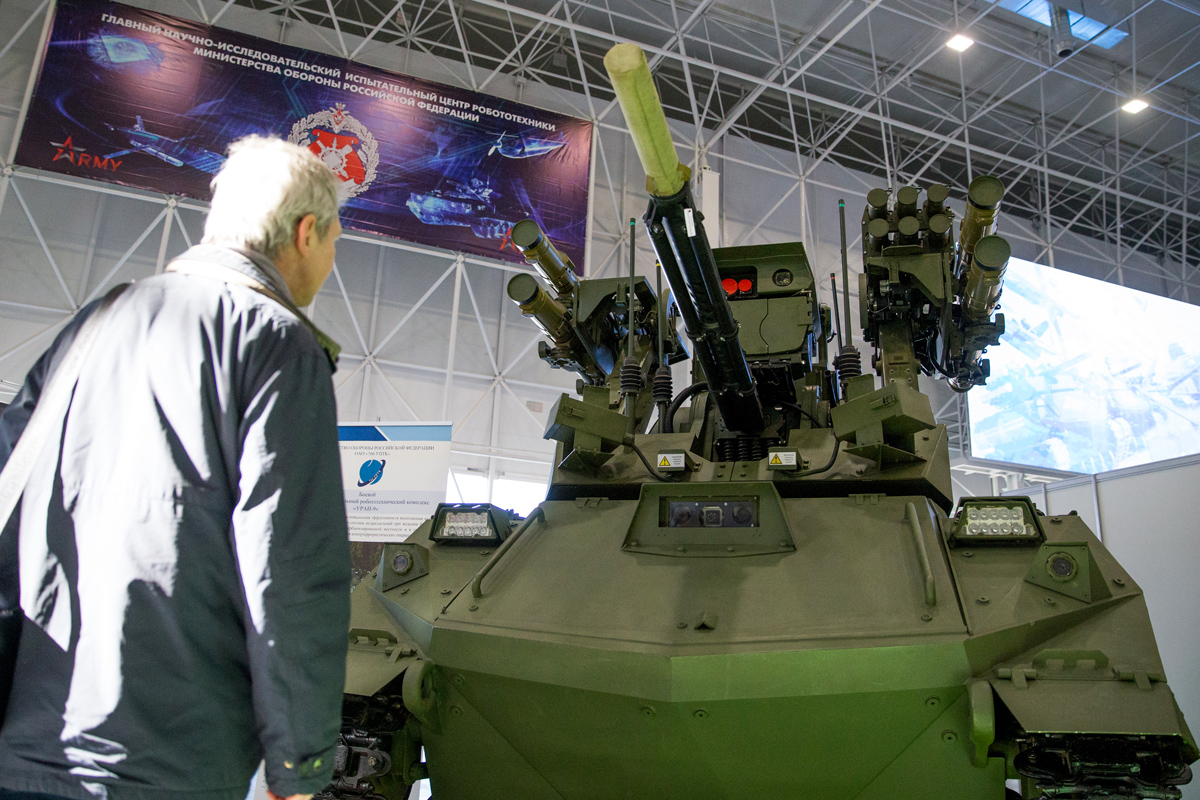
Uran-9 on showing.

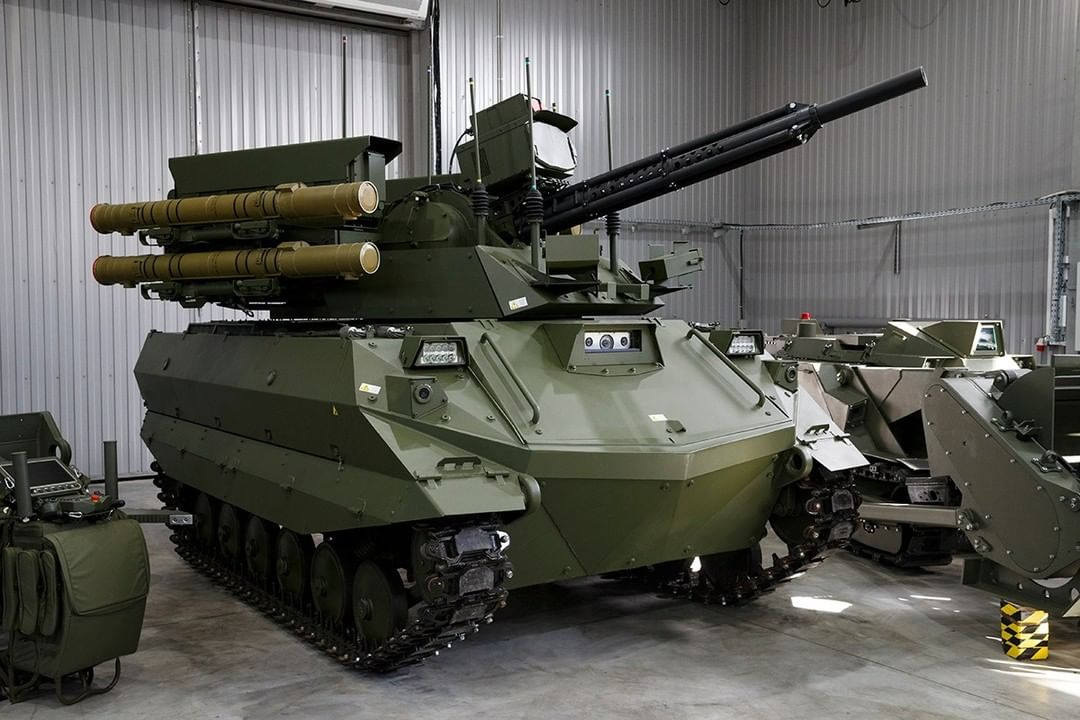
Combat robot Uran-9.

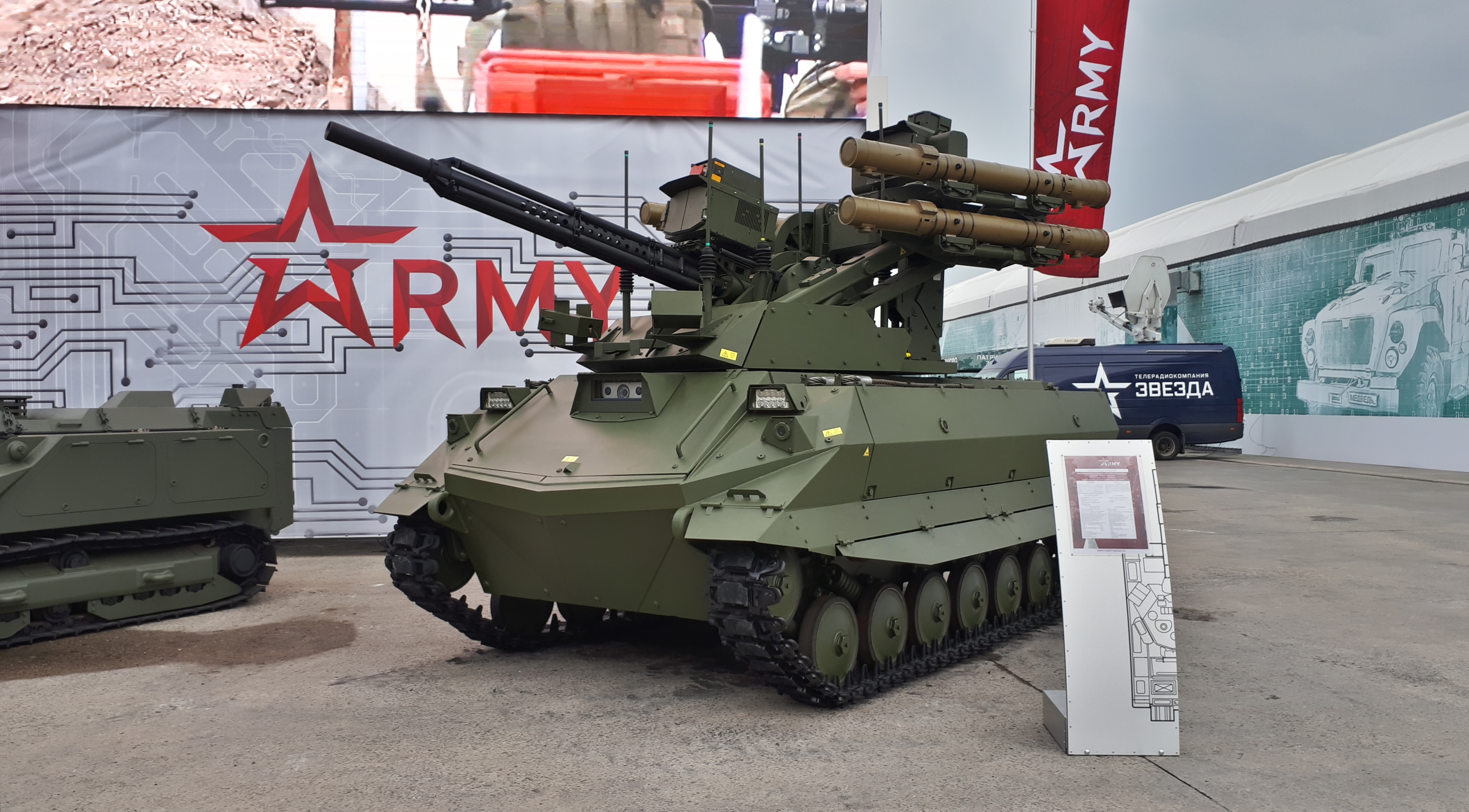
Serial combat model.

== Opportunities ==
According to the manufacturer, the combat platform has the following features:

- Movements from on-board batteries in the engine shut-down mode;
- Movement along a given route with automatic detection and detour of obstacles;
- Receiving and transmitting control commands from a mobile control point (PPU) and a remote control (remote control) to another RROP (retransmission);
- Remote (via radio channel) control with remote control and remote control;
- Automatic tracking of goals;
- The control range from the control panel to the control panel is at least 3 km and depends on the terrain and climatic conditions;
- The range of retransmission of signals and information between RFCs is at least 1 km;
- Each control panel and control panel are equipped with a laser radiation warning system, which allows the operator to determine the source of radiation in the 30° sector;
- As additional protection measures, a smoke screen installation system has been installed on the RROP, which allows for the automatic installation of a smoke (interference) curtain in the sector from which the laser irradiation of the RROP is coming.

== Literature ==
- Paul Scharre. Army of None: Autonomous Weapons and the Future of War. — W. W. Norton & Company, 2018. — P. 114–116. — 407 p. — ISBN 9780393608991.
- Stephan De Spiegeleire, Matthijs Maas, Tim Sweijs. Artificial Intelligence and the Future of Defense: Strategic Implications For Small- and Medium-Sized Force Providers. — The Hague Centre for Strategic Studies, 2017. — P. 82. — 140 p. — ISBN 9789492102546.
