= M5 crowd control munition =

MCCM device in standalone role.

Back of MCCM showing its raised molded diamonds and wording ("Back Nonlethal") and lighter green color.

The M5 modular crowd control munition (MCCM) is a non-lethal direct fire device used to disperse, incapacitate and deny area access to large groups of people with percussion and flash (flash-bang) along with the impact from 600 high-velocity rubber or plastic balls moving outwards towards the crowd. It can be deployed and set up by troops (mounted or dismounted) and detonated via a command wire.

It is similar in use and design to the M18A1 Claymore mine, but is non-lethal. Used for area denial, standoff situations, crowd control (i.e. outside embassies) by law enforcement and military services, the MCCM is effective to around 30 meters covering a 60–to-80 degree horizontal arc, with a minimum safe standoff distance of five meters from the face of the device.

The MCCM is deployed in a minimum force role, where lethal outcomes may not be desired. It is a low hazard munition consisting of a 0.04" layer of sheet explosive (propellant). On one side of the sheet lies the projectiles (of .32 caliber, rubber or plastic PVC material) and on the other side, a foam sheet. These components are held together by an inert binder similar to plasticine.

As described above, the MCCM is very similar to the M18A1 Claymore mine, except that the MCCM has a molded, tactile surface of raised diamonds on its back plastic cover which is a different color (light green), for easier discrimination between a lethal M18A1 Claymore and the non-lethal MCCM.

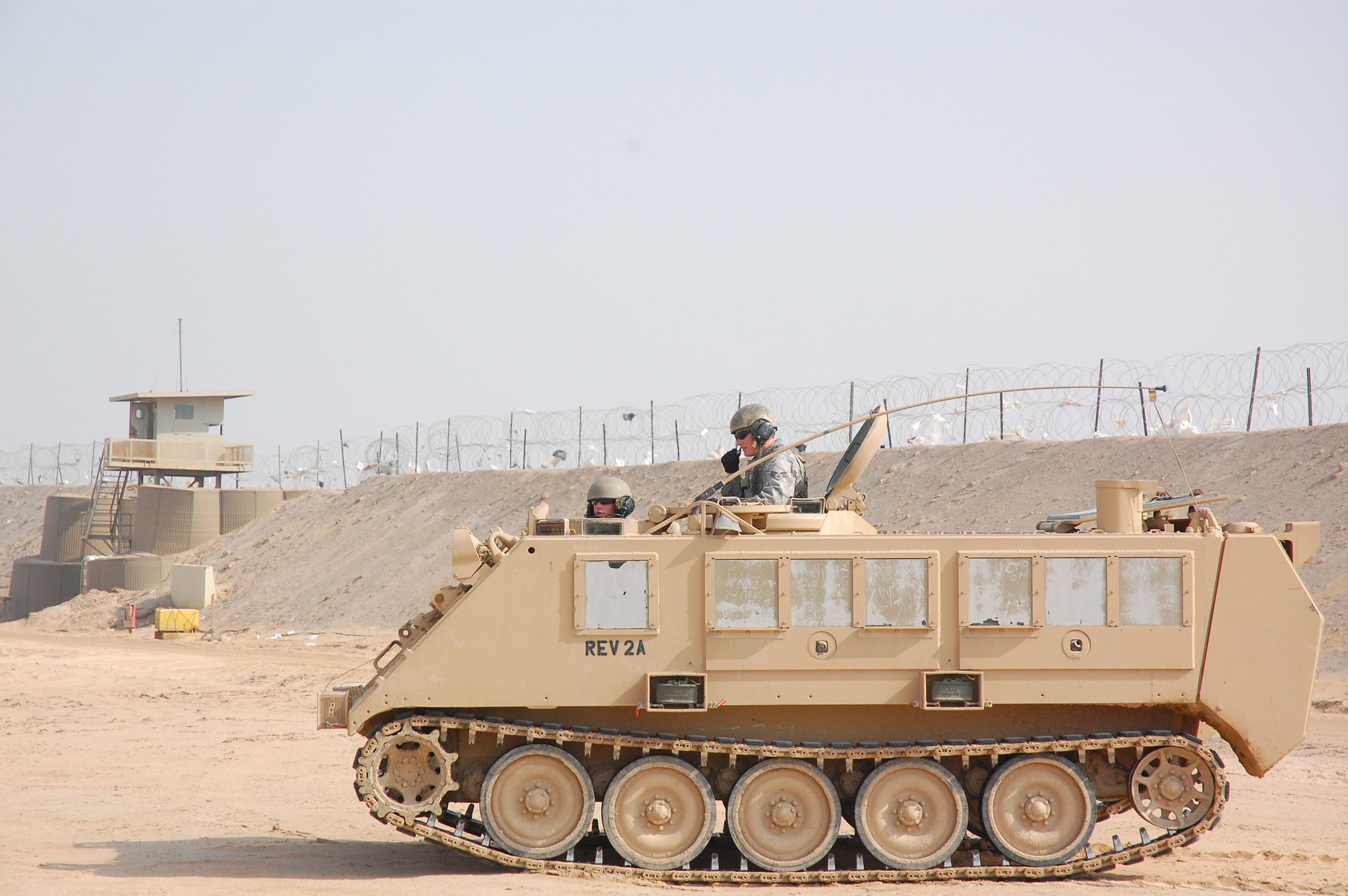
USAF M113 APC using a variant of the MCCM mounted onto the sides of the vehicle at the Theater Internment Facility (TIF) at Camp Bucca, Iraq, 10 Feb 2008. The vehicle is assigned to the 886th Expeditionary Security Forces Squadron's quick response force.

It is currently in use by US military forces for area protection and defense. It can be vehicle mounted (for vehicle protection, and show-of-force crowd control), mounted to buildings and fencing, or used as a standalone device.
