= JAUS Tool Set =

The JAUS Tool Set (JTS) is a software engineering tool for the design of software services used in a distributed computing environment. JTS provides a graphical user interface (GUI) and supporting tools for the rapid design, documentation, and implementation of service interfaces that adhere to the Society of Automotive Engineers' standard AS5684A, the JAUS Service Interface Design Language (JSIDL). JTS is designed to support the modeling, analysis, implementation, and testing of the protocol for an entire distributed system.

== Overview ==
The JAUS Tool Set (JTS) is a set of open source software specification and development tools accompanied by an open source software framework to develop Joint Architecture for Unmanned Systems (JAUS) designs and compliant interface implementations for simulations and control of robotic components per SAE-AS4 standards. JTS consists of the components:

- GUI based Service Editor: The Service Editor (referred to as the GUI in this document) provides a user friendly interface with which a system designer can specify and analyze formal specifications of Components and Services defined using the JAUS Service Interface Definition Language (JSIDL).
- Validator: A syntactic and semantic validator provides on-the-fly validation of specifications entered (or imported) by the user with respect to JSIDL syntax and semantics is integrated into the GUI.
- Specification Repository: A repository (or database) that is integrated into the GUI that allows for the storage of and encourages the reuse of existing formal specifications.
- C++ Code Generator: The Code Generator automatically generates C++ code that has a 1:1 mapping to the formal specifications. The generated code includes all aspects of the service, including the implementations of marshallers and unmarshallers for messages, and implementations of finite-state machines for protocol behavior that are effectively decoupled from application behavior.
- Document Generator: The Document Generator automatically generates documentation for sets of Service Definitions. Documents may be generated in several formats.
- Software Framework: The software framework implements the transport layer specification AS5669A, and provides the interfaces necessary to integrate the auto-generated C++ code with the transport layer implementation. Present transport options include UDP and TCP in wired or wireless networks, as well as serial connections. The transport layer itself is modular, and allows end-users to add additional support as needed.
- Wireshark Plugin: The Wireshark plugin implements a plugin to the popular network protocol analyzer called Wireshark. This plugin allows for the live capture and offline analysis of JAUS message-based communication at runtime. A built-in repository facilitates easy reuse of service interfaces and implementations traffic across the wire.

The JAUS Tool Set can be downloaded from www.jaustoolset.org User documentation and community forum are also available at the site.

== Release history ==
Following a successful Beta test, Version 1.0 of the JAUS Tool Set was released in July 2010. The initial offering focused on core areas of User Interface, HTML document generation, C++ code generation, and the software framework. The Version 1.1 update was released in October 2010. In addition to bug fixes and UI improvements, this version offered several important upgrades including enhancement to the Validator, Wireshark plug-in, and generated code.

The JTS 2.0 release is scheduled for the second quarter of 2011 and further refines the Tool Set functionality:

- Protocol Validation: Currently, JTS provides validation for message creation, to ensure users cannot create invalid messages specifications. That capability does not currently exist for protocol definitions, but is being added. This will help ensure that users create all necessary elements of a service definition, and reduce user error.
- C# and Java Code Generation: Currently, JTS generates cross-platform C++ code. However, other languages including Java and C# are seeing a dramatic increase in their use in distributed systems, particularly in the development of graphical clients to embedded services.
- MS Word Document Generation: HTML and JSIDL output is supported, but native Office-Open-XML (OOXML) based MS Word generation has advantages in terms of output presentation, and ease of use for integration with other documents. Therefore, we plan to integrate MS Word service document generation.

In addition, the development team has several additional goals that are not-yet-scheduled for a particular release window:

- Protocol Verification: This involves converting the JSIDL definition of a service into a PROMELA model, for validation by the SPIN model checking tool. Using PROMELA to model client and server interfaces will allow developers to formally validate JAUS services.
- End User Experience: We plan to conduct formal User Interface testing. This involves defining a set of tasks and use cases, asking users with various levels of JAUS experience to accomplish those tasks, and measuring performance and collecting feedback, to look for areas where the overall user experience can be improved.
- Improved Service Re-Use: JSIDL allows for inheritance of protocol descriptions, much like object-oriented programming languages allow child classes to re-use and extend behaviors defined by the parent class. At present, the generated code 'flattens' these state machines into a series of nested states which gives the correct interface behavior, but only if each single leaf (child) service is generated within its own component. This limits service re-use and can lead to a copy-and-paste of the same implementation across multiple components. The team is evaluating other inheritance solutions that would allow for multiple leaf (child) services to share access to a common parent, but at present the approach is sufficient to address the requirements of the JAUS Core Service Set.

== Domains and application ==
The JAUS Tool Set is based on the JAUS Service Interface Definition Language (JSIDL), which was originally developed for application within the unmanned systems, or robotics, communities. As such, JTS has quickly gained acceptance as a tool for generation of services and interfaces compliant with the SAE AS-4 "JAUS" publications. Although usage statistics are not available, the Tool Set has been downloaded by representatives of US Army, Navy, Marines, and numerous defense contractors. It was also used in a commercial product called the JAUS Expansion Module sold by DeVivo AST, Inc.

Since the JSIDL schema is independent of the data being exchanged, however, the Tool Set can be used for the design and implementation of a Service Oriented Architecture for any distributed systems environment that uses binary encoded message exchange. JSIDL is built on a two-layered architecture that separates the application layer and the transport layer, effectively decoupling the data being exchanged from the details of how that data moves from component to component.

Furthermore, since the schema itself is widely generic, it's possible to define messages for any number of domains including but not limited to industrial control systems, remote monitoring and diagnostics, and web-based applications.

== Licensing ==
JTS is released under the open source BSD license. The JSIDL Standard is available from the SAE. The Jr Middleware on which the Software Framework (Transport Layer) is based is open source under LGPL. Other packages distributed with JTS may have different licenses.

== Sponsors ==
Development of the JAUS Tool Set was sponsored by several United States Department of Defense organizations:

- Office of Under Secretary of Defense for Acquisition, Technology & Logistics / Unmanned Warfare.
- Navy Program Executive Officer Littoral and Mine
- Navy Program Executive Officer Unmanned Aviation and Strike Weapons
- Office of Naval Research
- Air Force Research Lab
