= Burrowing vehicle =

Vehicle that travels through the earth as it moves

A burrowing vehicle is a manned or unmanned vehicle that would travel through the earth/rock as it moves, while underground. The Afeka College of Engineering is testing an autonomous vehicle which could burrow underground and destroy hidden bunkers or underground areas/dwellings.

== Robotic Underground Munition ==
In 2010, the Weapons and Capabilities Division (RD-CXW) of the Defense Threat Reduction Agency (DTRA) submitted a request for information (RFI) regarding technologies suitable for use in the Robotic Underground Munition (RUM). According to the RFI, "the RUM would be a one-time use, air-delivered, highly mobile vehicle having certain characteristics similar to an unmanned ground vehicle." The design is to be able to "avoid, traverse, neutralize or defeat natural and man-made obstacles", all of which would be encountered in an attempt to break fortified structures. According to Popular Science, "One of DTRA's missions is keeping weapons of mass destruction in check, so it's probably safe to assume the main objective here is to be able to locate and, if necessary, destroy underground weapons caches or development sites."
