= Guardium =

Israeli unmanned ground vehicle

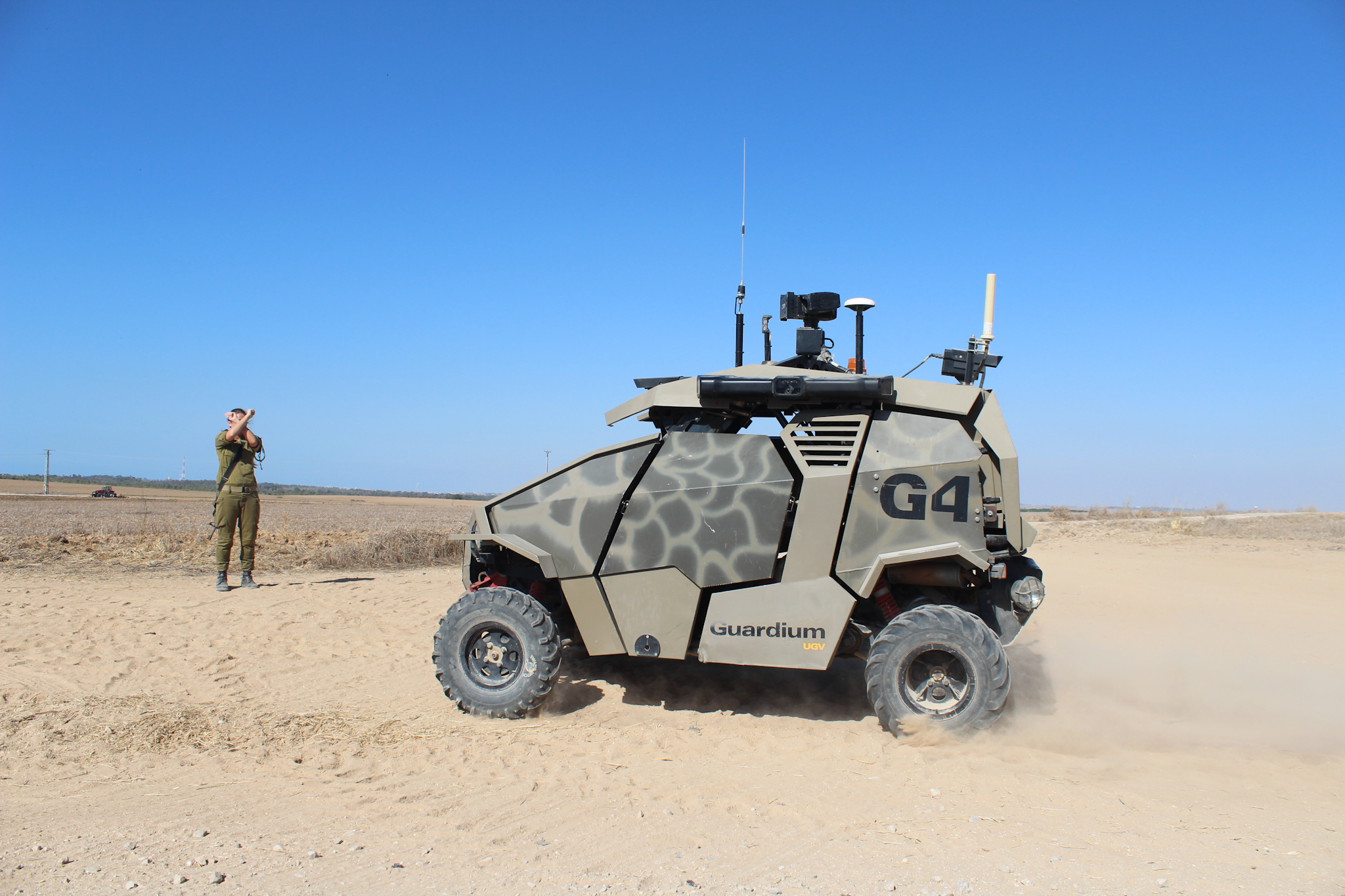
Guardium unmanned ground vehicle

Guardium, developed by G-NIUS, is an Israeli unmanned ground vehicle (UGV) used by the Israel Defense Forces along Gaza's border. It was jointly developed by Israel Aerospace Industries and Elbit Industries. It can be used in either tele-operated or autonomous mode. Both modes do not require human interaction. The more unmanned ground vehicles patrolling the area the less human resources needed while guaranteeing deterrence. The joint program was terminated in April 2016, but the vehicle has remained in service with the IDF.

== Features ==
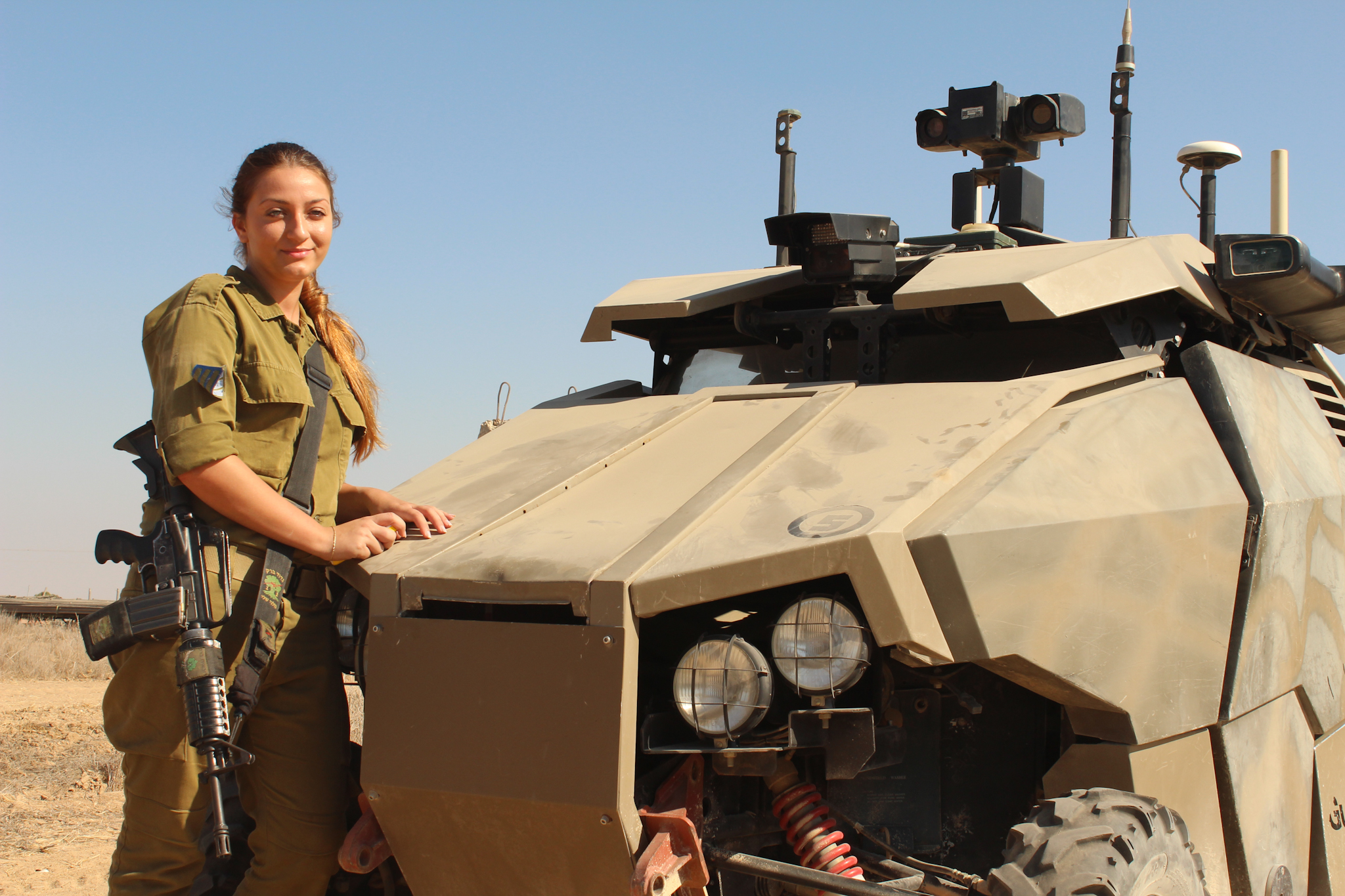
The size of the vehicle compared to a person.

Guardium is equipped with sufficient armor to protect itself in light fire attacks and against multiple enemies. The vehicle is 2.95 meters long, 1.8 meters wide and 2.2 meters high. It is considered to be a medium-sized combat vehicle, about the size of a Jeep J8; it weighs 1.4 tons and can go up to 80 km/h for up to several days depending on the amount of usage. The vehicle is equipped with: infrared cameras, radars, high-sensitivity microphones, visible sensors, and hostile fire indicators. The equipment was built for unpredicted attacks, but its main purpose is surveillance. The vehicles contain both lethal and non-lethal weapons for protection. It is simple to operate, with stationary, mobile, and portable operational versions. It can be remotely controlled by the mobile command station, where the computers have built in maps. It can also be pre-programmed to drive itself along assigned routes. Powerful sensors can detect unpredicted obstacles and an infrared camera can spot invaders in the dark. When it goes off road, this equipment enables operation in any terrain and weather.

=== Autonomous Mode ===
Autonomous robots work with their surroundings and make decisions based on it. The vehicle or robot can work for extended periods of time without human interaction. In this mode it can be set to a certain location or can be put on a ground path and it will cover its designated area until needed or for up to 103 consecutive hours. This mode can sense abnormal circumstances and avoid them.

=== Tele-Operated Mode ===
The tele-operated mode lets the operating team know the Guardium's whereabouts at all times. The vehicle is controlled by the people monitoring its environment. It sends data to the command station letting them know its location, destination, and the view of its surroundings through its rotating camera. It is possible because of the wireless connection built inside the vehicle that transmits the data directly to the server in the command station.

== Technology ==
=== Cameras ===
The main camera is up on top which can rotate a full 360 degrees for full access to the terrain. The cameras can capture thermal images and they have the ability to take videos in certain situations. In cases when the guardium comes across an invader it will record the confrontation for government records and for future access. The cameras have built in auto-target so that it comes to focus when an enemy or object comes in range. They also have back up batteries to in cases where they need to run for 24 hours non-stop.

== Gallery ==
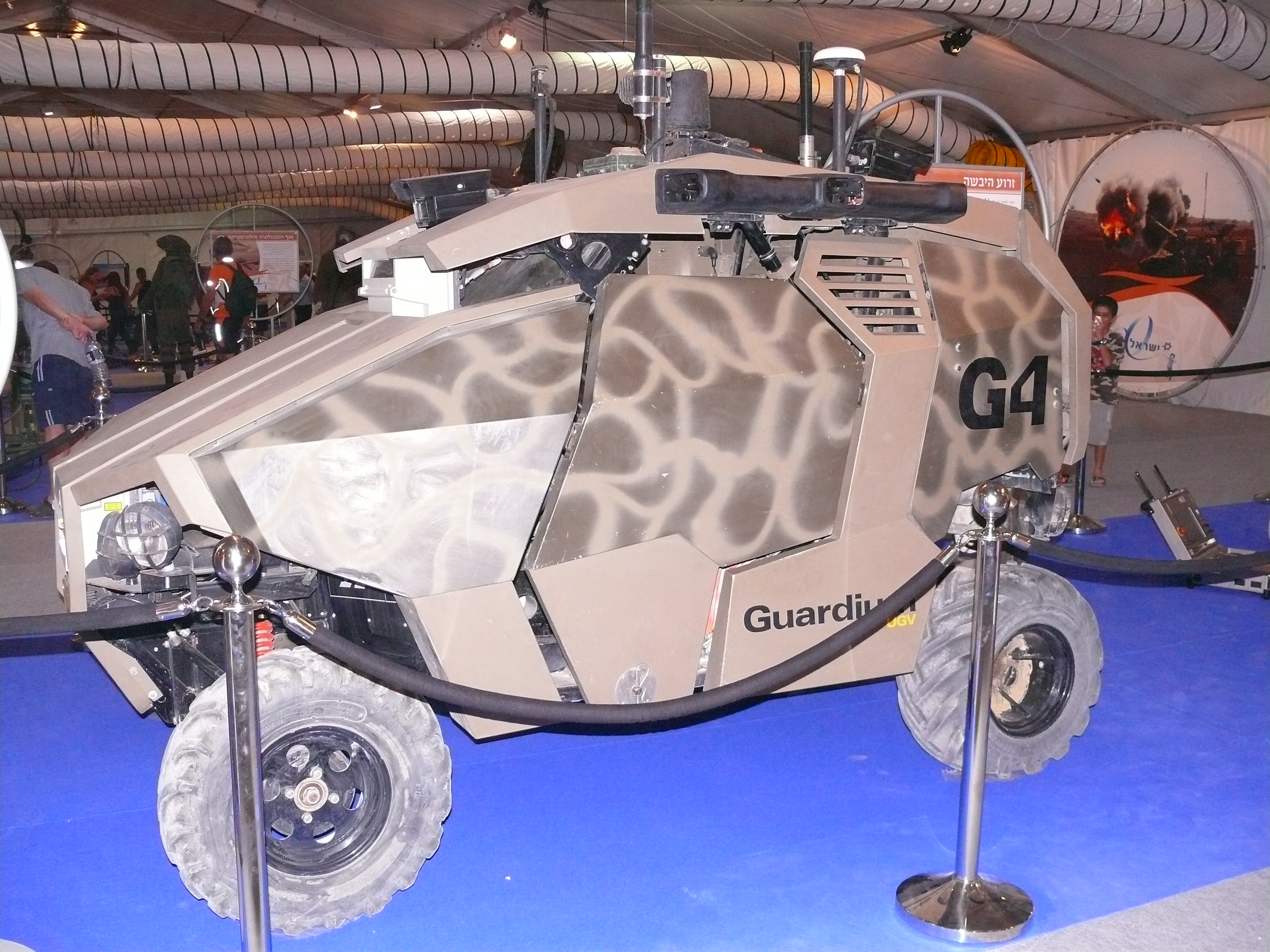

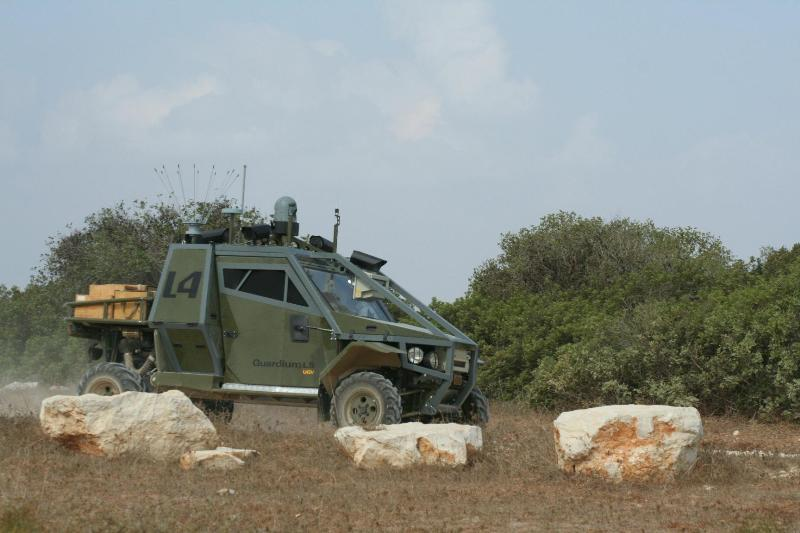

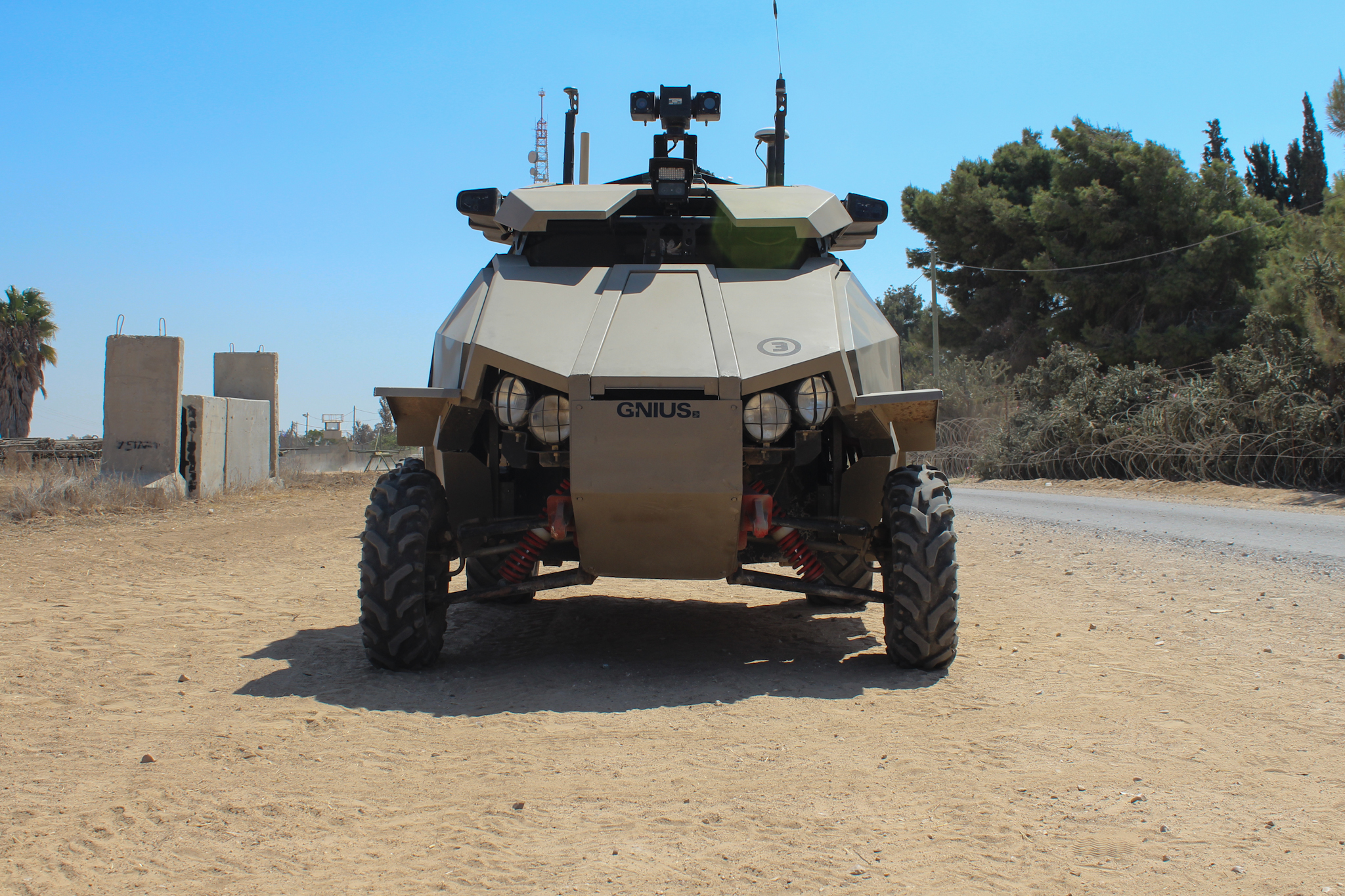

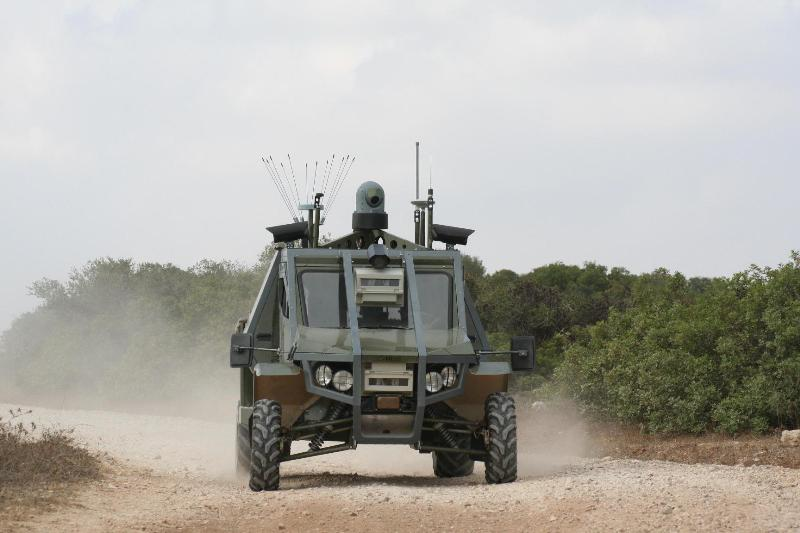

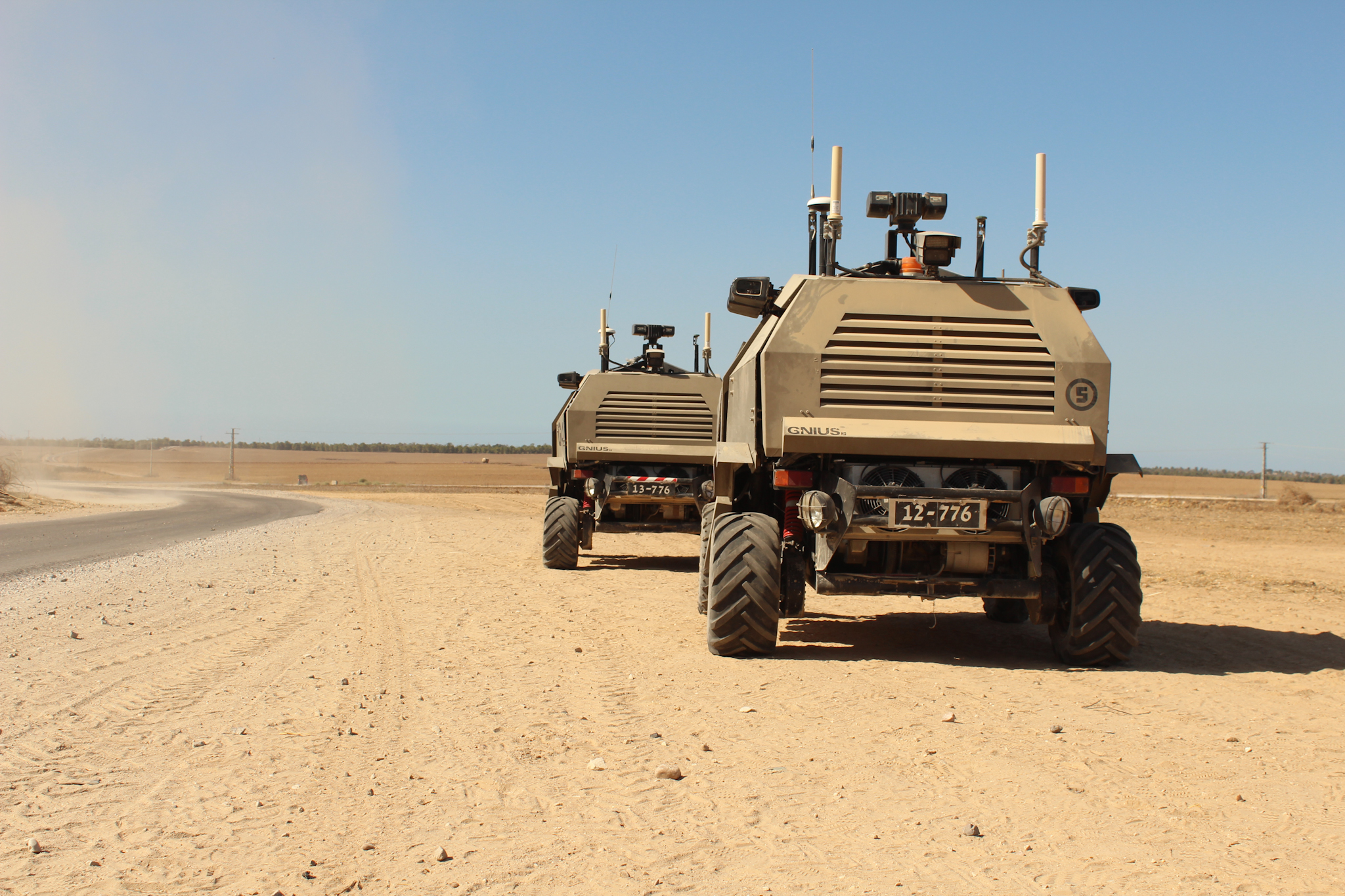

== See also ==
- Robattle
