= Howe & Howe Technologies =

American armored vehicle company

Howe & Howe Technologies (H&H, H and H, or HH) is an American private business headquartered in Waterboro, Maine that specializes in the development, manufacturing, fabrication and design of specialized armored and military-grade-spec vehicles, most notably the Ripsaw combat vehicle. Other products include the Badger, recognized as the world's smallest armored assault vehicle by Guinness World Records and the SR1, or Subterranean Rover 1. The Ripsaw is claimed to be the world's fastest dual tracked vehicle.

H&H is run by twin brothers Michael "Mike" and Geoffrey "Geoff" Howe. Mike is the president of the company and chief engineer while Geoff is the CEO and company manager.

The company is also featured in Howe & Howe Tech, a reality television series produced by Authentic Entertainment for the Discovery Channel.

Howe & Howe Technologies was acquired by Textron Systems in 2018.
