= List of Michigan writers =

Following is a list of Michigan writers, who are noteworthy either by having been born in Michigan or by living there during their writing career.

== Children's books ==
- Verna Aardema, author of ethnic-themed works (Ashanti, Zanzibari, Akamba and Ayutla Mexican sources), winner of Caldecott Medal (born in New Era)
- K. A. Applegate, children's and young adult author (born in Ann Arbor)
- Mark Crilley, manga creator, children's book author/illustrator; creator of Miki Falls, Akiko, Brody's Ghost, and POP! Goes the Weasel (born in Detroit)
- Christopher Paul Curtis, author, won Newbery Medal and Coretta Scott King award (born in Flint)
- Marguerite de Angeli, writer and illustrator, won 1950 Newbery Award, one of first inductees of Michigan Women's Hall in of Fame (born in Lapeer)
- Meindert DeJong, received 1962 Hans Christian Andersen Award, Newbery Medal, and National Book Award (resided in Grand Rapids, attended Calvin College)
- Aileen Fisher (1906–2002), author (born in Iron River)
- Margaret Hillert, poet and author of children's literature (born in Saginaw, taught in Royal Oak School District)
- Laurie Keller, writer and illustrator (born in Muskegon)
- Patricia Polacco, author (Union City)
- Robert Sabuda, pop-up book artist and paper engineer (born in Pinckney)
- Gary Schmidt, author of children's literature and young adult fiction (college professor in Grand Rapids)
- Jon Scieszka, author (born in Flint)
- Devin Scillian, author (broadcaster in Detroit)
- Philip C. Stead, author (born in Farmington Hills)
- Chris Van Allsburg, author of The Polar Express, twice winner of Caldecott Medal (born in East Grand Rapids)
- Gloria Whelan, author born in Detroit, winner of National Book Award for Young People's Literature for 2000
- Christopher Wright, author of American Chillers and Michigan Chillers (born in Pontiac, Michigan)

== Fiction ==
- Nelson Algren, novelist (born in Detroit)
- John Edward Ames, western writer (born in Monroe County)
- Harriette Simpson Arnow, novelist (resided in Ann Arbor)
- Robert Asprin, science-fiction and fantasy writer (born in St. Johns)
- Mathis Bailey, novelist and fiction writer
- Deb Baker, author (born in Escanaba)
- Emma Pow Bauder, novelist (born in North Adams)
- Rex Beach, novelist (born in Atwood)
- John Bellairs, mystery novelist (born in Marshall)
- Mary K. Buck, author (lived and died in Traverse City)
- Bonnie Jo Campbell, author (born in Kalamazoo)
- Jaqueline Carey, fantasy author (resides in Michigan)
- Mary A. Cornelius (1829–1918), author, social reformer (born in Pontiac)
- Katherine Cowley, taught at Western Michigan University
- James Oliver Curwood, novelist and conservationist (born in Owosso)
- Loren D. Estleman, crime fiction author (born in Ann Arbor; graduate of Eastern Michigan University)
- Jeffrey Eugenides, novelist (born in Detroit)
- Edna Ferber, novelist (born in Kalamazoo)
- Alice Fulton, short-story writer (born in Troy, New York; moved to Ypsilanti)
- J. Gabriel Gates, young adult and science-fiction writer (raised in Michigan)
- Donald Goines, novelist (born in Detroit)
- Jaimy Gordon, novelist (born in Baltimore, taught at Western Michigan University, lives in Kalamazoo)
- Charlotte E. Gray, novelist and religious writer (born in Reading)
- Judith Guest, novelist and screenwriter (born in Detroit)
- Aaron Hamburger, short-story writer and novelist (born in Detroit)
- Steve Hamilton, mystery and thriller novelist (born in Detroit)
- Jim Harrison, novelist, poet, screenwriter (born in Grayling, attended Michigan State University)
- Jim C. Hines, fantasy novelist and short-story writer (attended Michigan State and Eastern Michigan)
- Joan Carol Holly, science fiction novelist (graduate of Michigan State University)
- James Hynes, author (born in Okemos)
- Alex Irvine, novelist and short-story writer (born in Ann Arbor, raised in Ypsilanti)
- Jerry B. Jenkins, novelist, author of Left Behind series (born in Kalamazoo)
- Janet Kauffman, novelist (born in Lancaster, Pennsylvania; moved to Hudson)
- Clarence Budington Kelland, short-story writer and novelist (born in Portland)
- William X. Kienzle, Catholic priest, mystery author (born in Detroit, resided in Grand Rapids)
- Brad Leithauser, poet, novelist, essayist (born in Detroit)
- Elmore Leonard, novelist and screenwriter (raised in Detroit, resided in Bloomfield Hills)
- Thomas Ligotti, reclusive writer of fiction and poetry (born and raised in Detroit)
- Josh Malerman, horror and fiction novelist (born in Southfield)
- Thomas McGuane, novelist and screenwriter (born in Wyandotte)
- Terry McMillan, author (born in Port Huron)
- Ander Monson, poet, essayist, novelist (born in Houghton)
- Joyce Carol Oates, novelist, winner of National Book Award (born in Lockport, New York, lived in metro Detroit and Windsor, Ontario)
- Steven Piziks, sci-fi author (born in Saginaw, Michigan)
- Alice Randall, author (born in Detroit)
- Lev Raphael, crime fiction author and author across genres (born in New York City)
- Marcus Sakey, crime novelist (born in Flint)
- K.J. Stevens, novelist and short-story writer (born in Alpena)
- Glendon Swarthout, novelist and short-story writer, winner of the O. Henry Prize (born in Pinckney)
- Lee Upton, novelist and short-story writer (born in St Johns)
- John D. Voelker, novelist who wrote Anatomy of a Murder under pen name Robert Traver (born in Ishpeming)
- Maritta Wolff, novelist (born in Grass Lake)
- Doug Worgul, novelist, journalist, and editor (born in St. Johns; raised in Battle Creek and Lansing; graduated from Western Michigan University)
- Michael Zadoorian, novelist and short-story writer (born in Detroit)

== Journalists and nonfiction ==
- Bruce Ableson, inventor of Open Diary (born in West Bloomfield)
- Mitch Albom, author, sportswriter, radio talk show host (born in Trenton, New Jersey; lives in metro Detroit)
- Ruth Alice Armstrong, non-fiction writer (born in Cassopolis)
- Ella H. Brockway Avann, religious writer (born in Newaygo)
- Catharine H. T. Avery, editor of The American Monthly, the official organ of the Daughters of the American Revolution (born in Dundee)
- Lepha Eliza Bailey, non-fiction writer (born in Battle Creek)
- Joel Bakan, legal writer and Canadian lawyer (born in Lansing)
- Ray Stannard Baker, 19th-century muckraking journalist (born in Lansing)
- Michael Barone, journalist, pundit, editor (born in Highland Park)
- M. E. C. Bates, writer, journalist, and newspaper editor
- Octavia Williams Bates, suffragist, clubwoman, writer (born in Detroit)
- Jim Bellows, newspaper editor in Washington, New York and Los Angeles (born in Detroit)
- Emma E. Bower, newspaper owner, publisher, and editor; physician (born and died in Ann Arbor)
- Robert K. Brown, war correspondent, founder of Soldier of Fortune magazine (born in Monroe)
- Martha A. Boughton, biographer, poet, songwriter (born in Corunna)
- Gene Caesar, writer of outdoor fiction (born in Saginaw, Michigan)
- Amanda Carpenter, author, former correspondent (born in Montrose)
- E. Jean Carroll, magazine writer and advice columnist (born in Detroit)
- Jill Carroll, journalist, Iraqi terrorists' kidnap victim (born in Ann Arbor)
- Bruce Catton, Pulitzer Prize-winning historian (born in Petoskey)
- Zev Chafets, journalist and columnist (born in Pontiac)
- Jonathan Chait, senior editor and columnist (grew up in metro Detroit)
- Lydia J. Newcomb Comings, non-fiction writer (born in Spring Lake)
- Arthur Danto, art critic for The Nation (born in Ann Arbor)
- Paul de Kruif, science writer and microbiologist (born in Zeeland)
- Rachael Denhollander, author, lawyer, advocate (born in Kalamazoo)
- James Deren, literary nonfiction writer (born in Detroit (resides in White Lake)
- Joe Falls, sportswriter for Detroit newspapers 1956–2004 (born in New York, moved to Detroit)
- M. F. K. Fisher, food writer (born in Albion)
- Terry Foster, sportswriter and radio personality (born in Detroit)
- Ron Fournier, national political journalist (born in Detroit)
- Jennifer Eaton Gökmen, literary nonfiction writer (born in Wayne, raised in West Bloomfield, in 1994 moved to Istanbul, Turkey)
- Lou Gordon, radio and TV commentator, talk show host, columnist, political reporter (born and based in Detroit)
- Jerry Green, sportswriter for Detroit newspapers 1963–2004
- John Grogan, columnist and author (born in Detroit)
- Ben Hamper, journalist and non-fiction writer (born in Flint)
- Jemele Hill, sports commentator and columnist for ESPN (born in Detroit)
- Loraine Immen, non-fiction writer (born in Mount Clemens
- Martha Waldron Janes, minister, reformer, columnist (born in Northfield Township; died in Muskegon)
- Michael Kinsley, editor, columnist (born in Detroit)
- Charlie LeDuff, journalist, author (born in Virginia, grew up in Westland)
- Karl Ludvigsen, editor of Car and Driver, Motor Trend (born in [Kalamazoo)
- Betty Mahmoody, author (born in Alma, Michigan)
- Lucy A. Mallory, magazine publisher, editor (born in Michigan)
- William McPherson, author and Pulitzer Prize-winning journalist (born in Sault Ste. Marie)
- John J. Miller, national political reporter (born in Detroit)
- Elvis Mitchell, film critic (born in Detroit)
- Michael Moore, documentary filmmaker and nonfiction writer (born in Flint)
- Jay Nordlinger, senior editor (born in Ann Arbor)
- Isabel Paterson, author, co-founder of libertarianism (born on Manitoulin Island, Canada; grew up on a rural Upper Peninsula ranch)
- Pauline Periwinkle, journalist, columnist, poet (born in Battle Creek)
- Neal Rubin, columnist, writer of comic strip Gil Thorp (born in California, lives in Farmington Hills)
- Tom Stanton, author of The New York Times bestseller Terror in the City of Champions" and other non-fiction books (born in Warren)
- Joseph Sobran, paleo-conservative syndicated columnist (raised in Ypsilanti)
- Jennie O. Starkey, first woman in Detroit to adopt journalism as a profession (born and died in Detroit)
- Louise Reed Stowell, scientist, non-fiction writer (born in Grand Blanc)
- Helen Thomas, journalist, White House correspondent (born in Winchester, Kentucky; moved to Detroit)
- Heather Ann Thompson, winner of 2017 Pulitzer Prize for History (born in Detroit)
- Paul Vachon, freelance journalist and local historian (born in Detroit in 1959)
- Bob Wojnowski, sports columnist and radio personality (born in Buffalo, New York, lives in metro Detroit)

== Playwrights and screenwriters ==
- Ron Allen, playwright (born in Detroit)
- Mike Binder, actor, director, screenwriter (born in Detroit, raised in Birmingham)
- Bruce Campbell, actor and autobiographer (born in Royal Oak)
- Jim Cash, screenwriter(born in Boyne City, lived in Grand Rapids)
- Francis Ford Coppola, screenwriter, director (born in Detroit)
- Pete Dexter, novelist, screenwriter (born in Pontiac)
- Gerald Di Pego, screenwriter (born in Flint)
- Jack Epps, Jr., screenwriter (attended Michigan State)
- Jim Harrison, novelist, screenwriter (attended Michigan State)
- Alice Emma Ives, dramatist, journalist (born in Detroit)
- Jake Kasdan, screenwriter, director (born in Detroit)
- Lawrence Kasdan, screenwriter, director (attended University of Michigan)
- Neil LaBute, playwright, director, screenwriter (born in Detroit)
- Elmore Leonard, novelist, screenwriter (lived in Bloomfield Hills)
- Thomas McGuane, novelist, screenwriter (attended Michigan State)
- Arthur Miller, playwright (attended University of Michigan)
- Ron Milner, playwright (born in Detroit)
- Jane Murfin, playwright, screenwriter (born in Quincy)
- Heather Raffo, playwright, actress (raised in Michigan)
- Ivan Raimi, screenwriter (born in Royal Oak)
- Sam Raimi, screenwriter, director, producer (born in Royal Oak)
- Terry Rossio, screenwriter, producer (born in Kalamazoo)
- Leonard Schrader, screenwriter (born in Grand Rapids)
- Paul Schrader, screenwriter, director (born in Grand Rapids)
- Sandra Seaton, playwright, librettist (lives in Michigan)
- Donald E. Stewart, screenwriter (born in Detroit)

== Poets ==
- Clara Doty Bates, poet, children's writer (born in Ann Arbor)
- John Malcolm Brinnin, poet (born in Halifax Nova Scotia; raised in Detroit)
- Eudora Bumstead, poet, hymnwriter (born in Bedford Charter Township)
- Jim Daniels, poet (born in Detroit)
- Toi Derricotte, poet (born in Hamtramck)
- Dorothy Donnelly, poet and prose writer (born in Detroit, raised in Grosse Pointe Park, resided in Ann Arbor)
- Myra Douglas, poet, short story writer (born in Adrian)
- Stuart Dybek, poet (born in Chicago; lives in Kalamazoo)
- Max Ellison, poet (lived in Bellaire)
- Clayton Eshleman, poet (born in Indianapolis, moved to Ypsilanti)
- Carolyn Forché, poet (born in Detroit)
- Robert Frost, poet (born in San Francisco, resided and taught in Ann Arbor)
- Alice Fulton, MacArthur "Genius Award" poet (born in Troy, New York; moved to Ypsilanti)
- Edgar Guest, poet (born in Birmingham, England; moved to Detroit)
- Jim Harrison, poet and novelist (born in Grayling)
- Robert Hayden, poet (born in Detroit; moved to Ann Arbor)
- Bob Hicok, poet (born in Grand Ledge)
- Conrad Hilberry, poet (born in Ferndale; moved to Kalamazoo)
- Lawrence Joseph, poet (born in Detroit)
- Ruth Ward Kahn, poet, non-fiction writer (born in Jackson, Michigan; attended University of Michigan)
- Jane Kenyon, poet (born in Ann Arbor)
- Mary Torrans Lathrap, poet (born and died in Jackson)
- Margaret Wynne Lawless, poet, non-fiction writer (born in Adrian)
- Philip Levine, poet (born in Detroit)
- Thomas Lynch, poet (born in Detroit)
- Naomi Long Madgett, poet (born in Norfolk, Virginia, raised in East Orange, New Jersey, moved to Detroit and Ypsilanti)
- Douglas Malloch, poet (born in Muskegon), known as the Lumberman's Poet
- Angel Nafis, poet (graduated from Huron High School)
- John Frederick Nims, poet (born in Muskegon)
- Marge Piercy, poet and novelist (born in Detroit)
- Dudley Randall, poet, Broadside Press founder (born in Detroit)
- Theodore Roethke, Pulitzer Prize and National Book Award-winning poet (born in Saginaw)
- Carol Smallwood, poet (born in Cheboygan)
- Richard Tillinghast, poet (born in Memphis, resides in Ann Arbor)
- Mary Frances Tucker, poet (born in York Township)
- Nancy Willard, poet, novelist, children's writer and literary critic (born in Ann Arbor)

== Others ==
- Wayne Dyer, self-help book writer (born in Detroit)
- James Finn Garner, humorist (born in Dearborn)
- Jerry B. Jenkins, religious writer, "as told to" biographer, romance writer (born in Kalamazoo)
- Ring Lardner, Sr., satirist, short story writer and sports columnist (born in Niles)
- Robert McKee, well-known creative writing instructor (born in Detroit)
- Peter McWilliams, writer and cannabis legalization advocate (born in Detroit)
- Stewart Edward White, writer (born in Grand Rapids)

== See also ==
- List of people from Michigan

== References and further reading ==
- Gavrilovich, Peter and Bill McGraw (2000). The Detroit Almanac. Detroit Free Press. ISBN 0-937247-34-0.
- Gavrilovich, Peter and Bill McGraw (2006). The Detroit Almanac, 2nd edition. Detroit Free Press. ISBN 978-0-937247-48-8.
