= Kärcher RC3000 =

The Kärcher RC 3000 was a robotic vacuum cleaner created by Kärcher in 2002, and manufactured until January 2015. Unlike other robotic vacuum cleaners of the time, the RC 3000 was designed with a self-service station that allows owners to keep their robots running (without human intervention) for longer periods of time. The service station, containing a paper bag, accomplishes this by acting as the collection point for the dirt and dust swept up by the robot.

Like other robots, the RC 3000 is equipped with basic sensors to aid in general operation, such as fall sensors (to prevent the robot from falling down stairs) and "jamming sensors" (to prevent the robot from getting stuck on obstacles). Designed to work on most carpets and hard floors, the manufacturer has noted that the robot may have problems operating on very high pile carpets (>20 mm).

== Description ==
=== RC3000 unit ===
The RC 3000 is 285x105 mm (DxH) and is two kilograms in weight. The units produced by Kärcher are yellow in coloration with IR sensors mounted beneath translucent plastic strips (used to find the service station) on the top of the unit. The unit has a bumper strip extending around the unit. A single ventilation port is visible on the back of the unit.

Turning the unit over reveals the two wheels on the underside of the unit in addition to the roller brush. A service port is accessible by lifting two levers on the underside of the unit. This service port gives access to the air filter and 0.2 litre dirt bin.

=== RC4000 unit ===
A short lived RC4000 was manufactured from 2011 to 2015, effectively a light grey version of the RC3000.

=== Self Service Station ===
The service station is much larger than the physical unit at 500x250x230 mm (LxBxH). The station weighs 5.8 kilograms and is designed for use with 220-240 VAC power sources. The base unit contains the collection bag and suction unit (for robot service). Additionally, the service station houses the scheduling and operation buttons for the unit, unlike other robots like the Neato and Roomba which have scheduling and operation buttons built into the robot.

== See also ==
- Domestic robots
- Roomba, a similar robotic vacuum.
  - The Roomba i7+ (2018) also has a basestation with large vacuum inside
