= American Chillers =

Horror novels for children

American Chillers and its predecessor series Michigan Chillers are a series of horror novels for children written by author Christopher Wright under the pen name of Johnathan Rand. The original series began in February 2000, with each book taking place in major cities and places in Wright's home state of Michigan. Its spin-off American Chillers was launched in December 2001 with a national focus, set to cover all fifty states and in the same continuity as the parent series, with its first book introducing a new character who teamed up with the protagonists of Michigan Chillers #1 and 9, while also including cameos by the main characters from five other books in the parent series. It, and every book since, concludes with the main character meeting a kid from another state, who had their own scary adventure and serves as the main character in the next book.

As of the 2023 release of book 45, only five states remain to be covered: Kansas, Maryland, Hawaii, New Mexico, and Louisiana.

== List of Michigan Chillers books ==
- #1: Mayhem on Mackinac Island (2000) — A brother and sister on vacation on Mackinac Island discover a fantasy world, and must defeat an evil sorcerer in order to escape.
- #2: Terror Stalks Traverse City (2000) — Two brothers must save Traverse City from a Yeti during Christmas time.
- #3: Poltergeists of Petoskey (2000) — Twins move into a house that is haunted and must banish the ghosts from their home.
- #4: Aliens Attack Alpena (2000) — Friends Mark and Meghan discover a spaceship full of aliens who want to take over the world and must stop them.
- #5: Gargoyles of Gaylord (2000) — Corky finds bite marks in his friend that match the teeth of Mr. Hansel's new stone gargoyle.
- #6: Strange Spirits of St. Ignace (2000) — Kevin and his family go camping, not knowing what danger lies ahead.
- #7: Kreepy Klowns of Kalamazoo (2000) — A carnival comes to town, but the clowns that come with it are after more than just laughs.
- #8: Dinosaurs Destroy Detroit (2000) — Friends Nick and Summer find a hole in time that allows them to go back in time to visit the dinosaurs, who later come back through the portal and destroy the city.
- #9: Sinister Spiders of Saginaw (2001) — Giant spiders rise up through the ground and attack the city of Saginaw.
- #10: Mackinaw City Mummies (2001) — Josh's friend Robyn is kidnapped by a mummy king and he must find a way to save her.
- #11: Great Lakes Ghost Ship (2005) — Two friends become trapped on a ghost ship.
- #12: AuSable Alligators (2005) — While fly fishing Craig hooks an alligator and he must figure out where they are coming from.
- #13: Gruesome Ghouls of Grand Rapids (2007) — Ashlen has the ability to see mystical creatures, but one day she sees an army of ghouls ready to take over her hometown and must stop them.
- #14: Bionic Bats of Bay City (2007) — A group of friends must stop a swarm of bionic bats terrorizing their city.
- #15: Calumet Copper Creatures (2011) — A sister and brother must escape a copper mine and the horrible monsters that live in it.
- #16: Catastrophe in Caseville (2013) — Shelby and her new friend go to the annual cheeseburger festival in Caseville and find a very destructive cheeseburger robot.
- #17: A Ghostly Haunting in Grand Haven (2016) — Two friends go ghost hunting with one of their dads and it goes wrong.
- #18: Sault Ste. Marie Sea Monsters (2017) — Horror is waiting in the deep and dark depths.
- #19: Drummond Island Dogman (2017) — For years, Michiganians have passed down tales of a horrifying, half-man, half-dog creature known as the Dogman.
- #20: Lair of the Lansing Leprechauns (2020) — When Fern sets out to find the fabled pot of gold, she finds something quite unexpected, which is a tiny man who resembles an honest-to-goodness leprechaun.
- #21: Boyne City Bigfoot Beast (2024) — In the woods, Noah and his friend Felicia encounter the feared fable beast Bigfoot.
- #22: Nightmare Babies of New Boston (2026) — Three kids discover a toy factory that creates baby dolls with a taste for more than just milk.
- #23: Evil Tarantulas of East Tawas — (Upcoming - December 2026)

== List of American Chillers books ==
- #1: Michigan Mega-Monsters (2001) — A pair of kids at a camp find a species of gigantic, mutated crayfish in the nearby lake.
- #2: Ogres of Ohio (2002) — A brother and a sister find magical artifacts and must keep them safe from ogres who will use them to destroy the world.
- #3: Florida Fog Phantoms (2002) — Three children must escape a cloud of fog, and the phantoms within it, or they will become trapped in it forever.
- #4: New York Ninjas (2002) — A magical mask must be protected by three friends, or else the world will be destroyed by a group of ghost ninjas.
- #5: Terrible Tractors of Texas (2002) — Farm equipment comes to life and attempts to destroy a boy and his cousin on a farm.
- #6: Invisible Iguanas of Illinois (2002) — A girl offers to watch her friend's iguanas, but these iguanas are huge and invisible.
- #7: Wisconsin Werewolves (2002) — A group of friends discover werewolves are real with the help of a librarian.
- #8: Minnesota Mall Mannequins (2003) — Aliens take control of mannequins to take over the world, and they have already taken over the Mall of America, trapping two friends inside.
- #9: Iron Insects Invade Indiana (2003) — An angry toy maker wants revenge on a rival by framing him for the destruction of Indiana by an army of robotic locusts.
- #10: Missouri Madhouse (2003) — Three kids who step into a supposedly haunted house late at night may never come out thanks to a boy who died years and years ago.
- #11: Poisonous Pythons Paralyze Pennsylvania (2003) — Three teens must survive one night in the wilderness with the world's deadliest snake on the loose.
- #12: Dangerous Dolls of Delaware (2003) — The doll that belonged to a ghostly child may help her dead spirit have revenge on an innocent young girl.
- #13: Virtual Vampires of Vermont (2004) — Unless two young video game addicts can stop them, an army of vampires from a video game could escape into reality.
- #14: Creepy Condors of California (2004) — When a condor attacks two kids in the Californian woods, they have no idea what they are in for.
- #15: Nebraska Nightcrawlers (2004) — Three friends meet a man who is attempting to make corn grow faster and get bigger. The problem is nightcrawlers have eaten it and grow as long as buses, posing a threat to human lives.
- #16: Alien Androids Assault Arizona (2005) — Aliens disguised as normal people are going to conquer the Earth if two friends do not get in the way.
- #17: South Carolina Sea Creatures (2005) — A boy places a toy similar to Sea Monkeys in water mixed with fertilizer. The toy grows to be a very large and aggressive, semi-aquatic monster.
- #18: Washington Wax Museum (2006) — A group of robbers will take thousands of dollars in artwork if three kids on a field trip do not stop them in time. Although the events in the previous book were never mentioned, the main character was a side character in South Carolina Sea Creatures.
- #19: North Dakota Night Dragons (2006) — A group of friends have to stop dragons from conquering a fantasy world, as well as the real one.
- #20: Mutant Mammoths of Montana (2007) — A brother and sister on a camping trip in the Montana wilderness soon discover a herd of aggressive subterranean mammoths that evolved after the ice age.
- #21: Terrifying Toys of Tennessee (2007) — Three friends must help a toymaker whose experimentation with a new type of battery turned his toys into monsters.
- #22: Nuclear Jellyfish of New Jersey (2007) — After a kid sees a UFO over a resort, giant, mutant, laser-shooting jellyfish destroy a water park. Although the events in the last book are never mentioned, the main character was a character in Terrifying Toys of Tennessee.
- #23: Wicked Velociraptors of West Virginia (2008) — After accidentally breaking a scientist's window, two friends offer to repay him by cleaning his lab windows. They find themselves going back in time after he completes a time travel invention experiment. The experiment works, but brings back three unwanted guests.
- #24: Haunting in New Hampshire (2008) — After moving into a new house, a girl is plagued by visions that only she can see, and who can also see her.
- #25: Mississippi Megalodon (2008) — Three friends go boating on a freshwater lake, but this particular lake is the hunting ground of a 60 ft long prehistoric shark.
- #26: Oklahoma Outbreak (2009) — A school becomes the scene of an outbreak of cooties, vicious insects whose bite turns people into zombies, and there is no cure.
- #27: Kentucky Komodo Dragons (2009) — While hiking, two siblings discover that Komodo dragons are loose in the forest, and they are extremely vicious.
- #28: Curse of the Connecticut Coyotes (2010) — A silly curse from an old witch becomes reality and three friends get trapped in the past.
- #29 Oregon Oceanauts (2010) — Two friends who are training to become divers are called to rescue a chemical barrel from a sunken submarine, but they discover that the chemical makes marine life far more aggressive than usual.
- #30: Vicious Vacuums of Virginia (2010) — Robotic vacuum cleaners come to life.
- #31: The Nevada Nightmare Novel (2011) — A novel comes to life.
- #32: Idaho Ice Beast (2011) — Two friends wander away from a ski resort to search for a mythical bigfoot creature, but when the creature starts hunting them, things get out of control.
- #33: Monster Mosquitoes of Maine (2012) — Mosquitoes grow to enormous sizes and attack Maine.
- #34: Savage Dinosaurs of South Dakota (2012) — Two friends who are both dinosaur lovers get a chance to visit a new dinosaur theme park, complete with mechanical lifelike dinosaurs, but the problem is that the dinosaurs are acting a little too lifelike.
- #35: Maniac Martians Marooned in Massachusetts (2012) — When a ship containing a race of violent aliens crash-lands on Earth, three friends find themselves fighting for their lives.
- #36: Carnivorous Crickets of Colorado (2012) — Two brothers' experiments on crickets mean big trouble for three friends who stumbled across their cricket farm.
- #37: The Underground Undead of Utah (2013) — Three fossil-hunters stumble on a frightening secret.
- #38: The Wicked Waterpark of Wyoming (2013) — A sinister world lies beneath the new water park, spelling danger for its patrons.
- #39: Angry Army Ants Ambush Alabama (2014) — The swamp hides an insect threat.
- #40: Incredible Ivy of Iowa (2014) — A farmer's experiments with super plant food create scary ivy.
- #41: North Carolina Night Creatures (2016) — Sinister creatures emerge during the night.
- #42: Arctic Anacondas of Alaska (2018) — In Fairbanks, Alaska, an old trapper's legend is about to become true. Sasha and her friend Trey are aware of the old legends of giant snakes that live in the ice and snow.
- #43: Robotic Rodents Ravage Rhode Island (2018) — Three friends discover mechanical rodents.
- #44: Arkansas Algae Monsters (2020) — Menacing monsters made of algae come to life.
- #45: The Giant Jack-O'-Lantern Of Georgia (2023) — Giant jack-o-lantern terrorizes the state.

== New covers ==
The American Chillers and the Michigan Chillers series both got new covers to commemorate the series' anniversary in 2005. These covers feature a combination gloss/melkote cover, providing a unique contrast. The new covers are by Dwayne Harris of Kalispell, Montana.
