= Pandemia =

2006 teen novel by Christopher Wright

- Author: Johnathan Rand
- Language: English
- Subject: Disease epidemic
- Genre: Post-apocalyptic, suspense, action, adventure
- Publisher: AudioCraft Publishing
- Publication date: July 2006
- Publication place: United States
- ISBN: 1-893699-87-0

Pandemia is a 2006 post-apocalyptic teen novel written by American author Johnathan Rand (a pseudonym of Christopher Knight). The novel depicts a scenario in which bird flu mutates and becomes a global epidemic because of modern transportation methods, eventually causing a universal state of emergency.

== Plot ==
The disease that causes a world-wide catastrophe in the novel is H5N1, a strain of bird flu that was in the news at the time of publication. Its mutation and rapid spread eventually causes the collapse of society and many economies across the world.

The book's central plot features a group of teens in Saline, Michigan who must try and escape the city and head to the countryside where they can hopefully stay alive long enough in their uncle's cabin to be rescued. But in doing so, the teens must use whatever weapons they can find to defend themselves against looters, insane killers, and potentially dangerous sources of infection. In a world gone mad, the group must find the necessities, food, water and shelter, to survive.
