= Roomba =

Series of autonomous robotic vacuum cleaners sold by iRobot

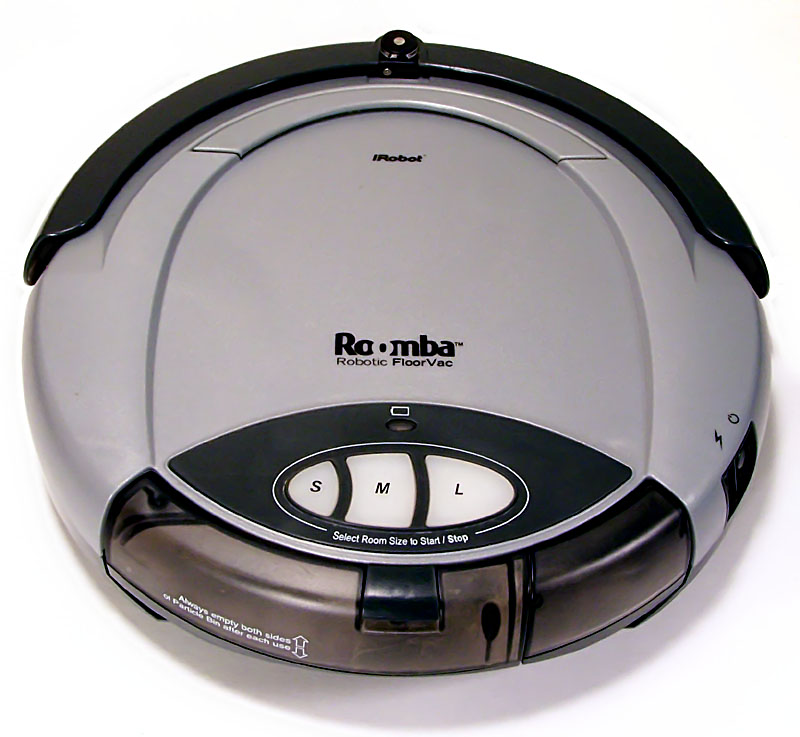
- Original Roomba from 2002
- Type: Robotic vacuum cleaner
- Inception: 17 September 2002; 24 years ago
- Manufacturer: iRobot
- Models: Full list
- Website: www.irobot.com/en_US/roomba.html

A Roomba is an autonomous robotic vacuum cleaner made by the company iRobot, and was first introduced in September 2002. Roombas have a set of sensors which help them navigate the floor area of a home. These sensors can detect the presence of obstacles and steep drops (e.g., to avoid falling down stairs).

As of 2024, iRobot markets models of their fourth through tenth generation, while continuing to provide support and to sell accessories for their previous series. Various models of the Roomba have different features, including tangle-free brushes, separate sweep canisters, more powerful vacuums, mopping technology, obstacle avoidance, and performance maps displayed via smartphone apps. Newer models also have a camera, which works in conjunction with onboard mapping and navigation software to systematically cover all floor areas, move from room to room, avoid obstacles such as pet waste and charging cables, and find charging stations.

== History ==
Engineer Joe Jones first conceived the idea for what eventually became the Roomba in 1989 while working at the MIT Computer Science and Artificial Intelligence Laboratory. The initial design, using LEGO bricks, stemmed from a design challenge between Jones and his colleagues. Early prototypes were created and presented to the Denning Mobile Robot Company and Bissell in the 1990s, but neither company was interested in producing them. The concept languished until 1999, when S.C. Johnson eventually agreed to fund the project at iRobot. The device was initially called "DustPuppy" before being renamed to Roomba. Development began in full in December 1999. S.C. Johnson pulled out after spending US$1–2 million, but iRobot continued with the project, eventually launching the first Roomba in September 2002.

== Design ==
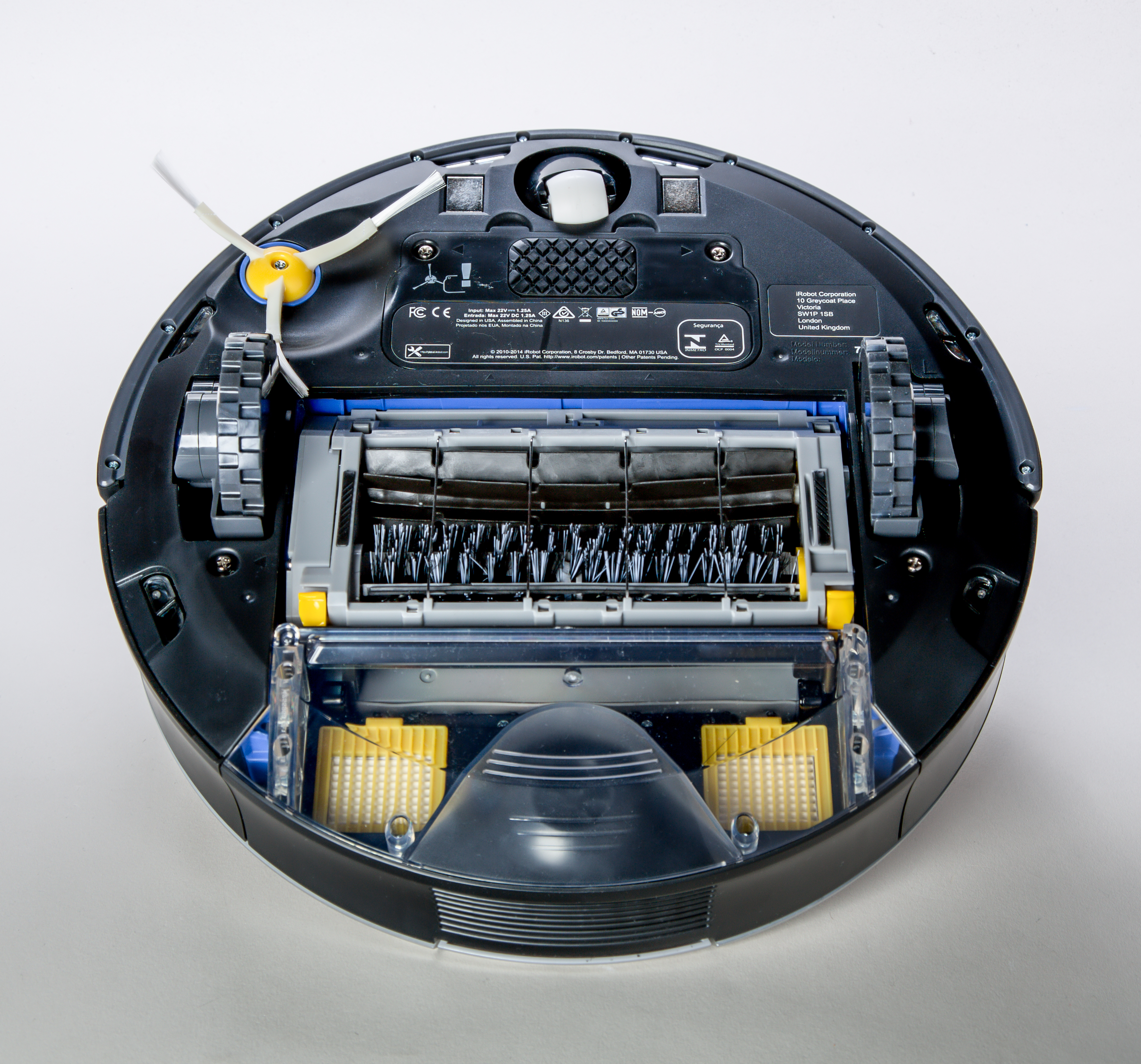
700 series model upside down, showing the two driving wheels, beater brushes, various sensors and other parts

Roomba models are designed to be low enough to fit under beds or other furniture. Most Roomba models are disc-shaped, measuring 338–353 millimetres (13.3–13.9 in) in diameter and 86–94 mm (3.4–3.7 in) in height depending on the model. The S9 series robots are semicircular rather than circular, with a flat part at the front, and are narrower at 311 mm (12.2 in) wide. All models feature a large contact-sensing mechanical bumper on the front half, with a multi-directional infrared sensor located at the top front center. Most models also have a recessed handle located on the top.

The first and second-generation Roomba models utilized the Virtual Wall, a separately sold accessory that prevents it from entering an area. It projects a pattern of infrared light, which the vacuum detects and treats as a physical wall, prompting it to stop and turn around. However, third-generation and newer models have now been made compatible with the Dual Mode Virtual Wall, which, in addition to simulating a straight wall, can create a circular barrier roughly 1.2 metres (4 ft) in diameter. Some 500, 700, and 800 series models are compatible with the Virtual Wall Lighthouse. It initially confines the vacuum to one area to be cleaned. Once the vacuum reports the area being sufficiently cleaned (based on its estimated area), it directs it to proceed to the next space to be cleaned and contains it there.

A Roomba's bumper allows it to sense when it has bumped into an obstacle, after which it will reverse or change paths. Infrared "cliff sensors" on the bottom of the unit similarly prevent them from falling off ledges such as stairs. These may also trigger a false positive on dark or black-colored surfaces, such as some carpets, preventing Roombas from entering or cleaning those areas. Third-generation and newer models have additional forward-looking infrared sensors to detect obstacles. These sensors slow down the Roomba's speed when nearing obstacles to reduce its force of impact. It also cleans along walls without repeatedly bumping into them. This technology can also distinguish between hard and soft obstacles.

Most second- and third-generation models, as well as all newer ones, have internal acoustic-based dirt sensors that allow them to detect and focus on particularly dirty spots. Fourth-generation and newer models have an optical sensor located in front of the vacuum bin, allowing detection of wider and smaller messes.

Third-generation and newer models can reverse their brushes' rotation direction to escape entangled cords and tassels. If at any time the unit senses that it has become stuck, is unable to turn its main brushes, no longer senses the floor beneath it, or decides that it has worked its way into a narrow area from which it is unable to escape, it stops and sounds an error alert to help someone find it. Early models use only flashing lights or several beeps to indicate specific problems, while later models use a synthesized voice to announce a problem and a suggested solution.

== Operation ==
=== Control and cleaning ===
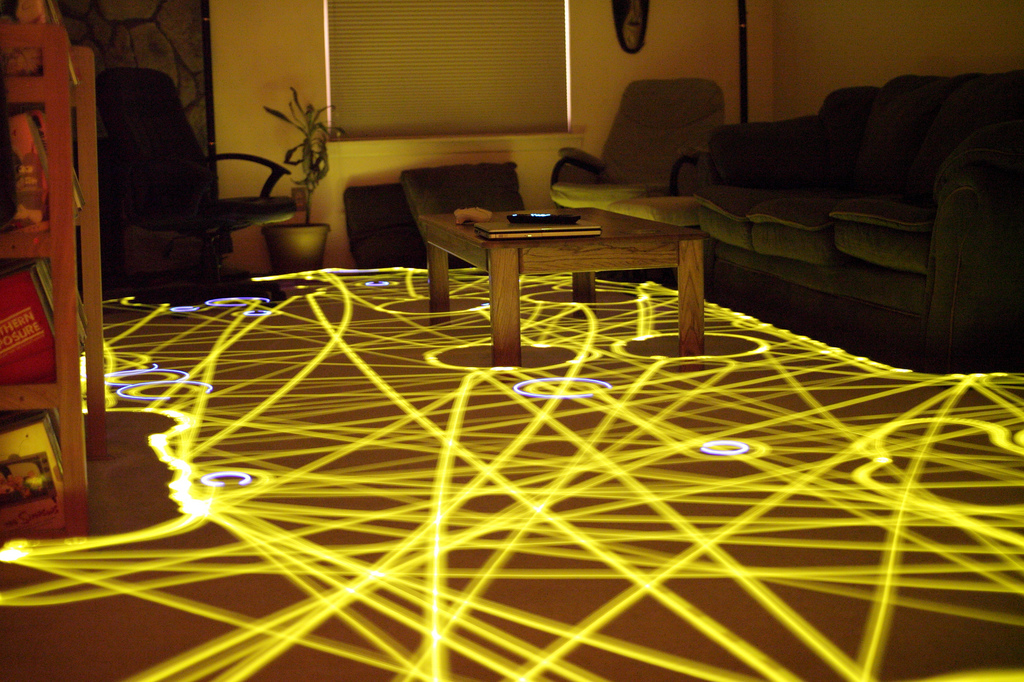
Long exposure photo showing path taken by a Roomba as it cleans

All Roomba models can be operated by manually carrying the Roomba to the room to be cleaned and pressing a button. Third-generation and later models can also be started directly from their charging bases. Later models introduced several additional operating modes, such as "spot", which cleans an area of a few feet. Older Roombas had a "max" mode, which cleans endlessly until the battery is depleted; this was replaced by "Clean" on later models that had the ability to calculate room size. "Dock" mode, introduced with the third generation, instructs the Roomba to seek a charging base for recharging. The availability of the modes varies by model. Many second- and third-generation Roombas and certain newer models (such as the 880), come packaged with infrared remote controls or special control panels, allowing a human operator to "drive" the Roomba to areas to be specially cleaned.

Subsequent Roomba models can be controlled with the iRobot HOME app, where users can start and pause the Roomba, send it back to the charging base, choose time limits for it to run before returning home, and view details about each cleaning job, such as how long the Roomba ran for and how the job ended (i.e., being completed, canceled or the battery dying).

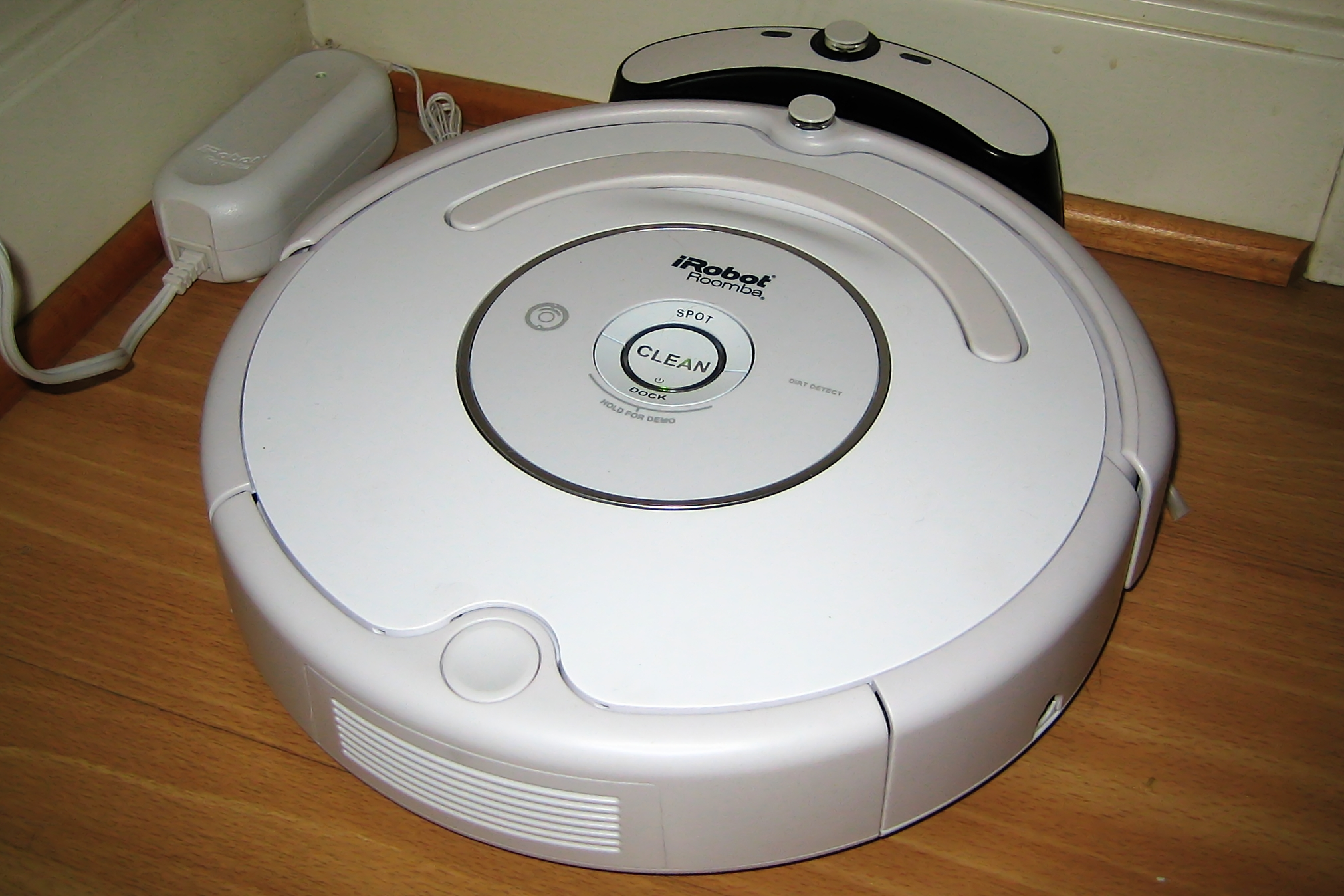
Roomba 530 on a charging station, which is plugged into a wall outlet

The cleaning time depends on room size and, for models equipped with dirt sensors, the volume of dirt. First-generation models must be told the room size, while subsequent models either estimate the room size by measuring the longest straight-line run they can perform without bumping into an object, or by creating a map of the room.

Non-desktop users can use the iRobot HOME App, although only certain models support 2.4 GHz. Wi-Fi connected Roombas can also connect to Alexa, Google Home, and other smart home platforms for voice control or use in automation.

=== Pathing ===
Starting with the sixth generation, Roombas have an upward-facing camera and a downward-facing infrared floor-tracking sensor, which are used to create a map of the floor. This enables them to use a back-and-forth cleaning pattern, which is faster and more efficient because it ensures more complete coverage without needing to cover an area multiple times. The floor-tracking sensor operates like an optical mouse and can provide precise movement data over small distances. However, this causes integration drift and small errors in measurement that accumulate over time. To rectify this, the upward-facing camera is used periodically to identify waypoints or "landmarks", coarse points that are used to correct the Roombas' position and map.

Roombas before the sixth generation models do not map out the rooms they are cleaning. Instead, iRobot developed a technology called iAdapt Responsive Cleaning Technology that relies on a few simple algorithms, such as spiraling, room crossing, wall following, and random walk angle changing after bumping into an object or wall. This design is based on MIT researcher and iRobot CTO Rodney Brooks' philosophy that robots should be like insects, equipped with simple control mechanisms tuned to their environments. The result is that, although Roombas are effective at cleaning rooms, they take several times longer to do the job than a human would. Some users have used long-exposure photography or compositing to create images showing Roombas' coverage of the floor, and have even attached light sources to Roombas to create art using light painting.

Some have also noted that doubts about the effectiveness of the random algorithms have been reinforced by multiple reports of Roombas rolling over dog feces and spreading them through the room, which rather unpleasantly illustrates how well the Roomba can cover the floor's area. Roombas have become a common example of how randomized algorithms can routinely succeed even though they cannot absolutely guarantee success on any single run or even after many repeated runs. Compared to competing products available when Roombas were first introduced, such as the Electrolux Trilobite, the effectiveness of Roombas' random navigation was on par with (or even more effective than) robotic mapping technology available at the time, and cheaper to develop and produce, meaning it was sold at a significantly lower price.

== Models ==
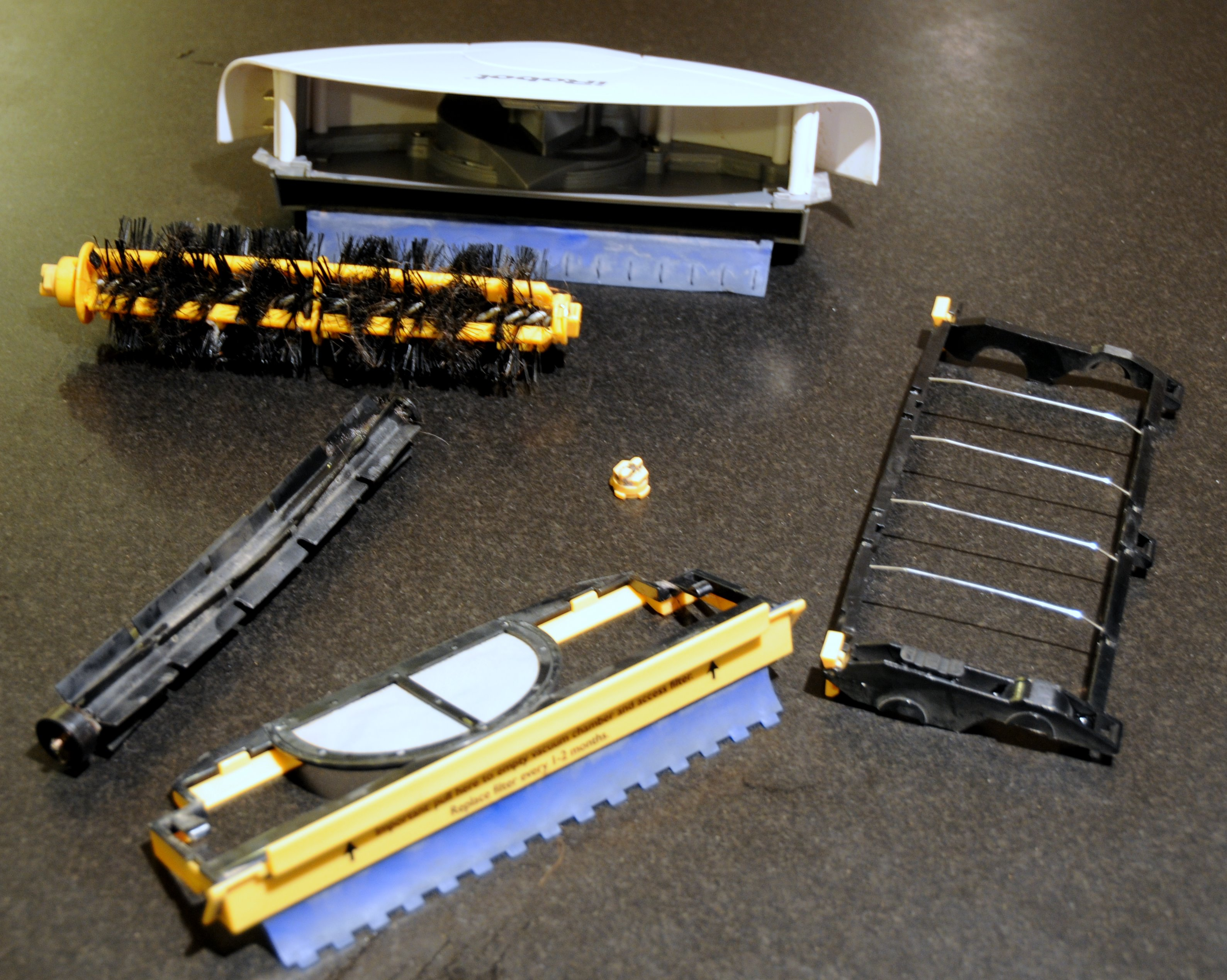
Various Roomba Discovery and 400 series parts (such as the bin, and filter)

As of 2025, there have been ten generations of Roomba units. All models have a patented design using pairs of brushes or rollers rotating in opposite directions to pick up debris from the floor.

The early-generation models use a random algorithm by "bumping" to achieve total room coverage. A small vacuum motor with the help of rotating brushes extract the debris into a removable dustbin. The robot moves around the room with two rubber wheels on the backside of the unit. Roomba's are equipped with several sensors, including inside the bumper mechanism. IR emitters and receivers are equipped inside the bumper to communicate with the Home Base or Clean Base during docking. These sensors also initiate the self emptying cycle (Clean Base only). An ultrasonic proximity sensor is also used to slow the Roomba down to minimize impact into walls. iRobot's patented "RCON" sensor is located on the top of the bumper. This sensor helps the Roomba avoid virtual walls and its home base and/or clean base. The robot is powered by a rechargeable battery contained inside the unit.

=== First generation: Original series ===
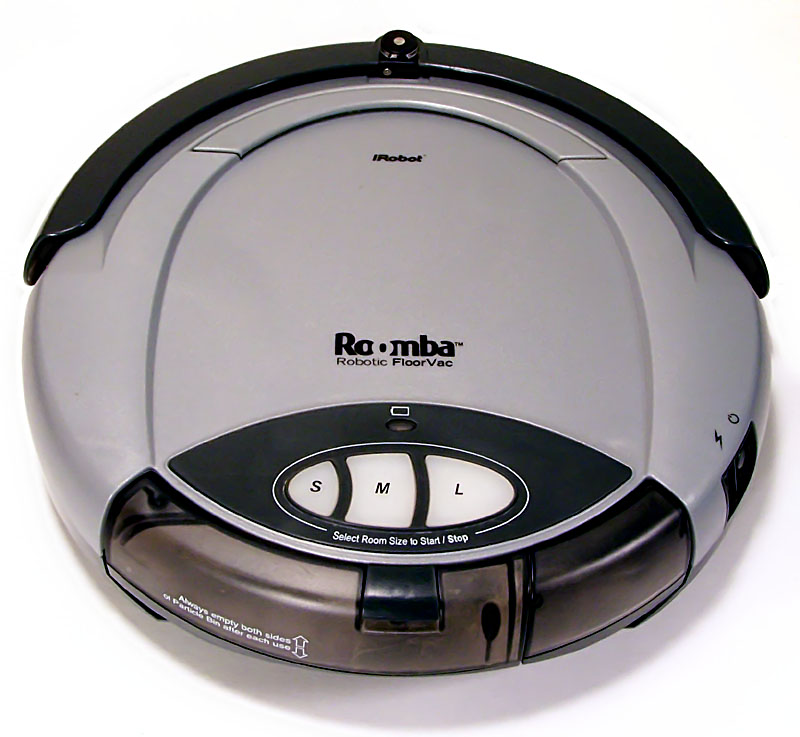
First-generation Roomba

Introduced in September 2002, the first-generation Roomba had three buttons for room size. The first-generation units comprised the original silver-colored Roomba, the blue Roomba Pro, and the maroon Roomba Pro Elite. The latter two models included additional accessories, but all three used the same core robot and cleaning system.

An original Roomba model robotic vacuum is in the collection of the National Museum of American History, which they note as the first successful domestic robot. The robot vacuum is described as being able to change direction when it encounters an obstacle or infrared beam and is powered by a battery.

=== Second generation: Discovery and 400 series ===
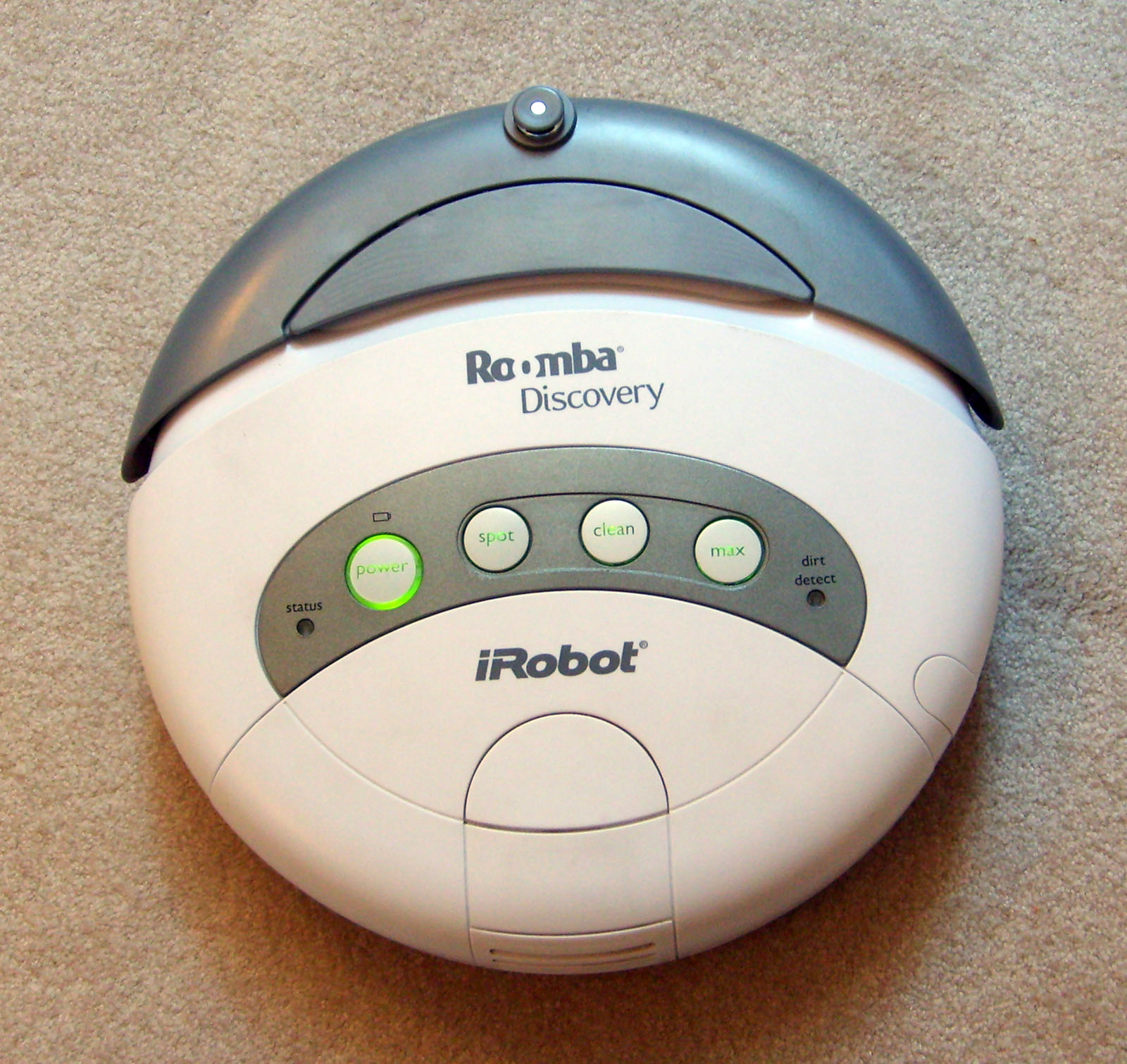
Roomba Discovery

The second-generation Roombas ("4000 series" later called the 400 series) replaced their predecessors in July 2004.

Roomba budget models (Dirt Dog and Model 401) used a simplified interface (a single "Clean" button) and lacked some of the software-controlled flexibility of other versions. They were less expensive models intended for first-time purchasers. The Roomba Dirt Dog contained sweeping brushes and a larger dust bin, but lacked the vacuum motor, using the space that would be required for the vacuum for additional dust bin volume. It was designed for a home shop or garage environment.

=== Third generation: Professional and 500/600 series ===
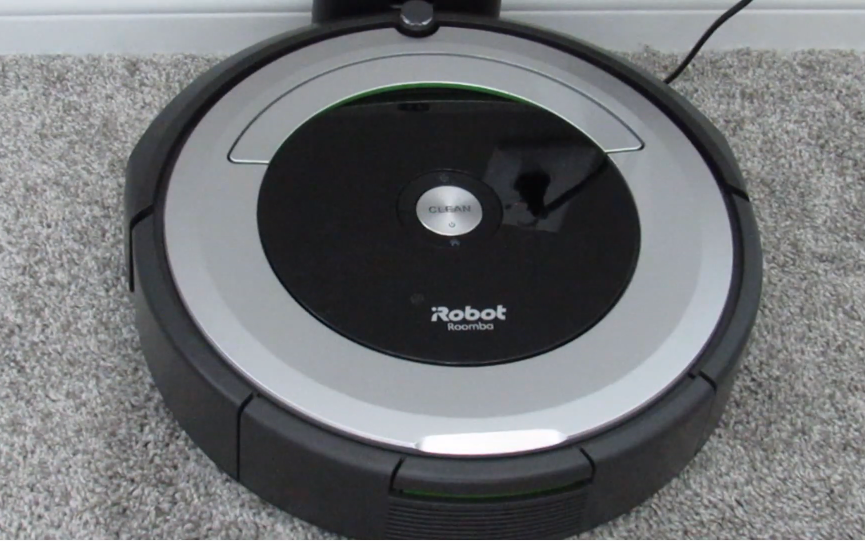
690 model

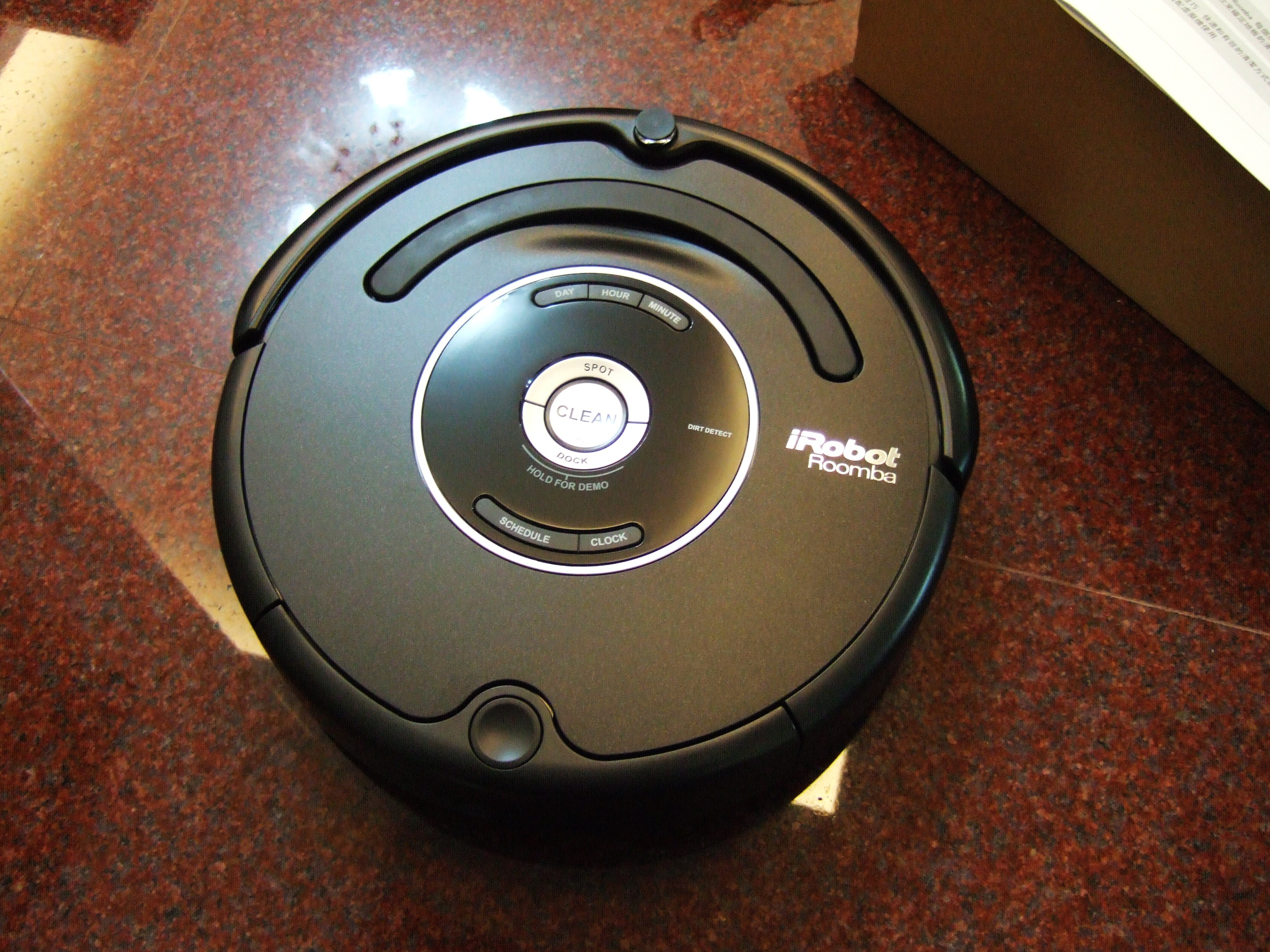
570 model

The 500 series was introduced in August 2007 and featured a forward-looking infrared sensor to detect obstacles and reduce impact speed, a docking command button, improved mechanical components, smoother operation, and a modular design to facilitate part replacement. The Roombas' speed is also increased, which is possible in part because of the sensors to avoid bumping into obstacles too hard. It also introduced customizable decorative face plates. The Roomba 530 included two virtual walls and a charging dock. The 560 was one of the first Roombas to offer onboard scheduling and was also sold in a 562 Pet Series model with different brushes designed to clean up pet hair.

The line was continued with the 600 series models, several of which had Wi-Fi enhancements. The 600 Professional Series robot was marketed towards small businesses. Several 600 series robots were praised for being budget friendly.

=== Fourth generation: 700 series ===
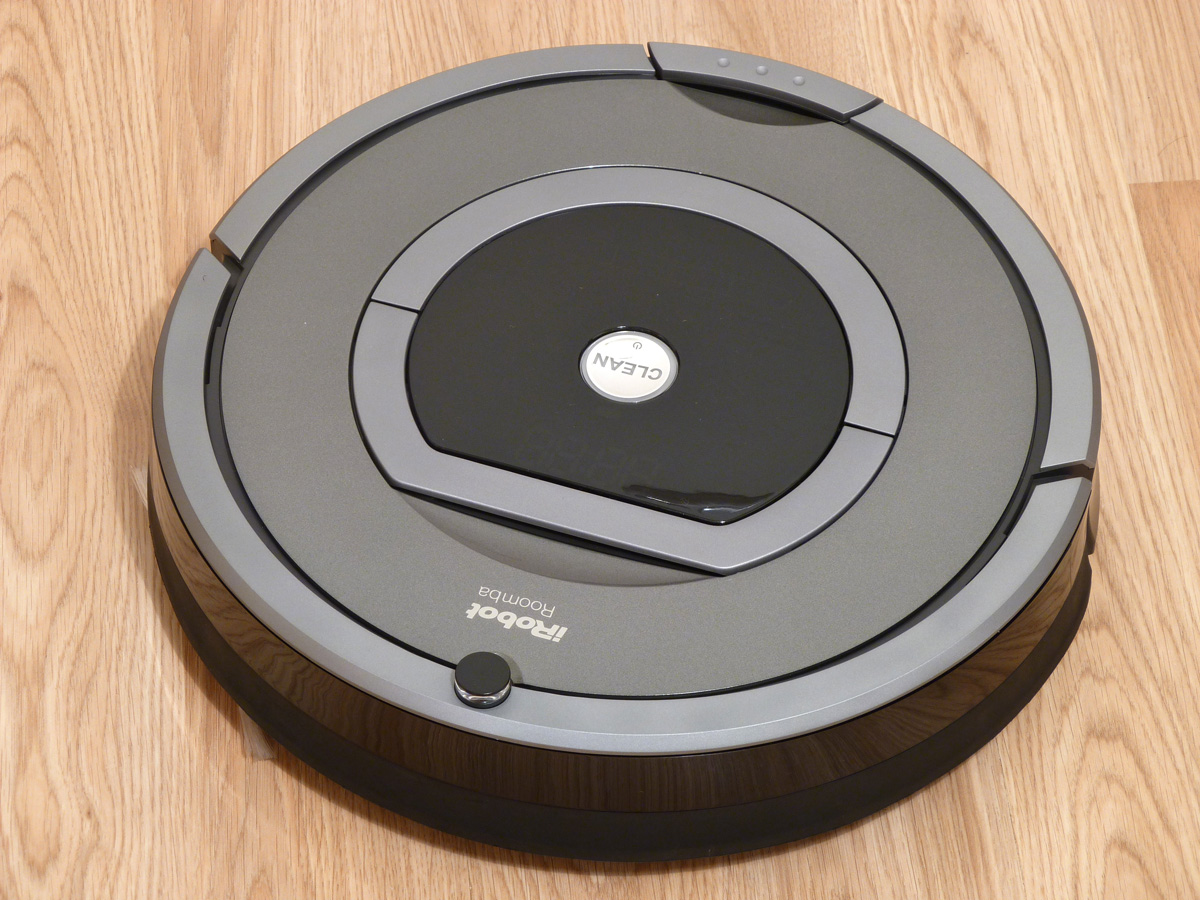
780 model

The 700 series, introduced in May 2011, though largely similar to the 500 and 600 series, included a more robust cleaning system, an improved AeroVac Bin with HEPA filter, and improved battery life. Like the 500 series, the 700 series had models with different technologies and accessories. The Roomba 760 was the simplest model, and the Roombas 780 and 790 were the most advanced, with both scheduling and a large range of accessories.

=== Fifth generation: 800 series ===
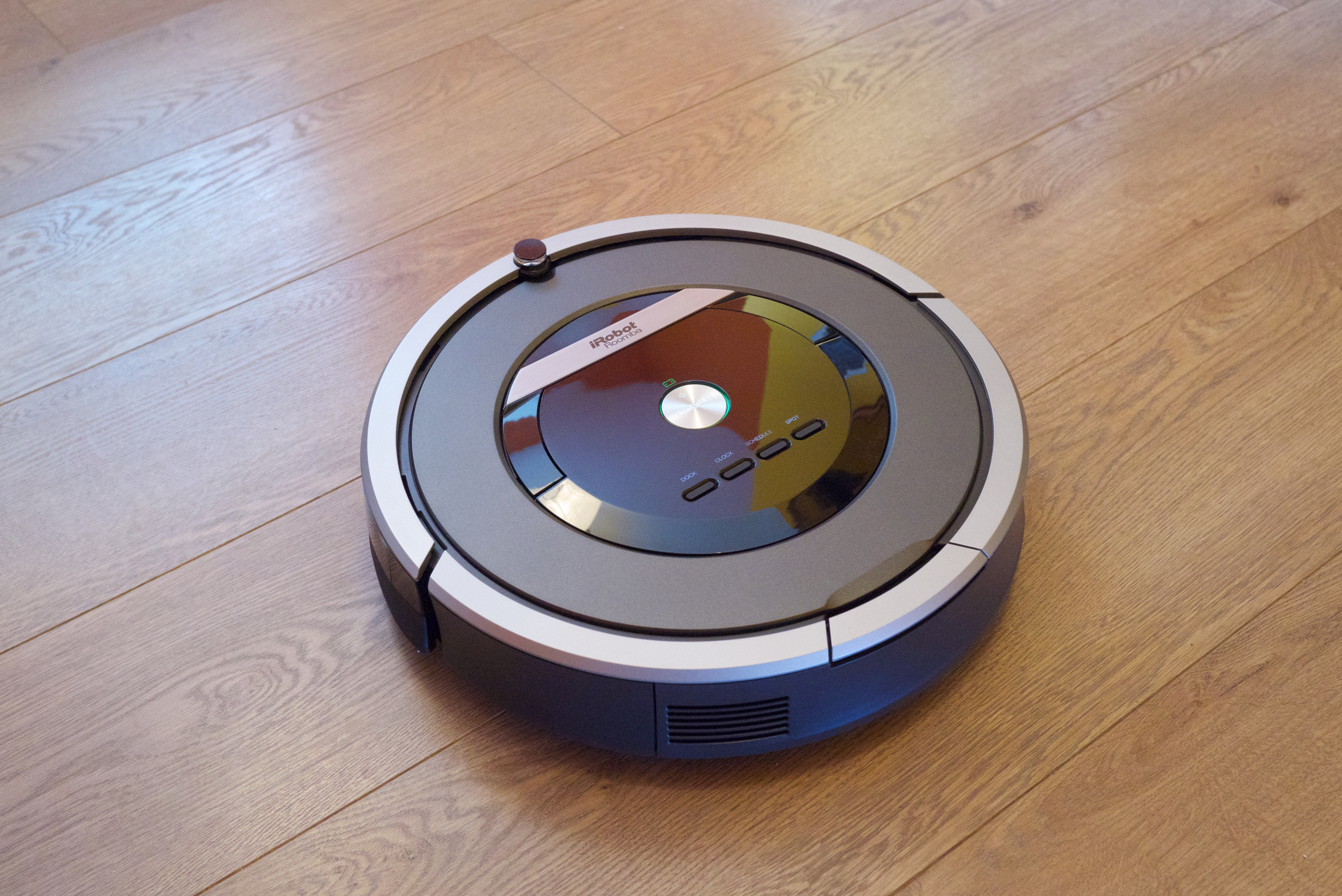
870 model

The 800 series, introduced in 2013, is similar to the 700 series and its predecessors but contains updated technology. The AeroForce Performance Cleaning System, which is five times more powerful than the older series, and the iRobot XLife battery are some of the new features. The AeroForce system does away with the large rotating brush and pulls air between two rubber rollers, thereby getting the vacuum suction closer to the floor. The 805, released in 2013, was one of the earliest 800 models that utilizes the AeroForce cleaning system and has scheduling abilities, which allows up to 7 pre scheduled runs per week, and comes with two virtual wall barriers. The 860 has an onboard HEPA filter and a more powerful motor and also contains a longer-lasting lithium-ion battery while the 870 and 880 have a NiMH (nickel–metal hydride) battery. In 2017, iRobot released the 890 with Wi-Fi connectivity that can be started with an app and various personal-assistant software.

=== Sixth generation: 900 series ===
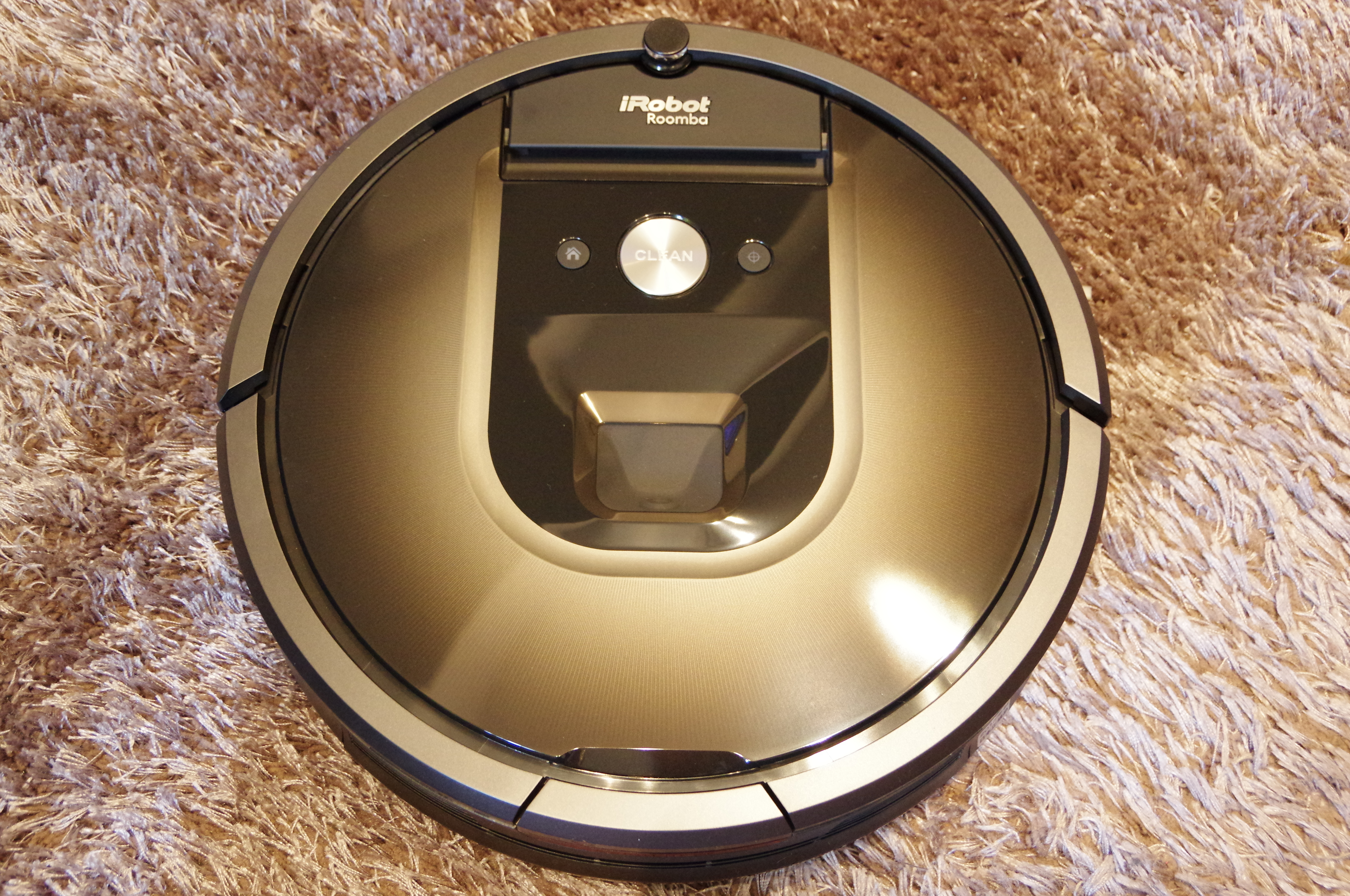
980 model

The Roomba 980 was released in September 2015 and contains a new iAdapt 2.0 visual vSLAM navigation system, which allows the robot to clean an entire level of a home more efficiently. The 980 also features Wi-Fi connectivity and an iPhone and Android app. The Roomba 960 was released on August 4, 2016. As of 2017, 900 series users can receive detailed cleaning maps of their Roomba through the app. The maps show exact areas of clean and dirty spots in the home, allowing the Roomba to know where it needs to spend more time cleaning. However, the maps are not retained between cleaning runs. Each time the Roomba vacuums, it builds a new map from scratch. Push notifications of when the Roomba is finished cleaning are also a new feature. Integration to Amazon's Echo was also announced, launching in spring 2017.

=== Seventh generation: i series and e series ===
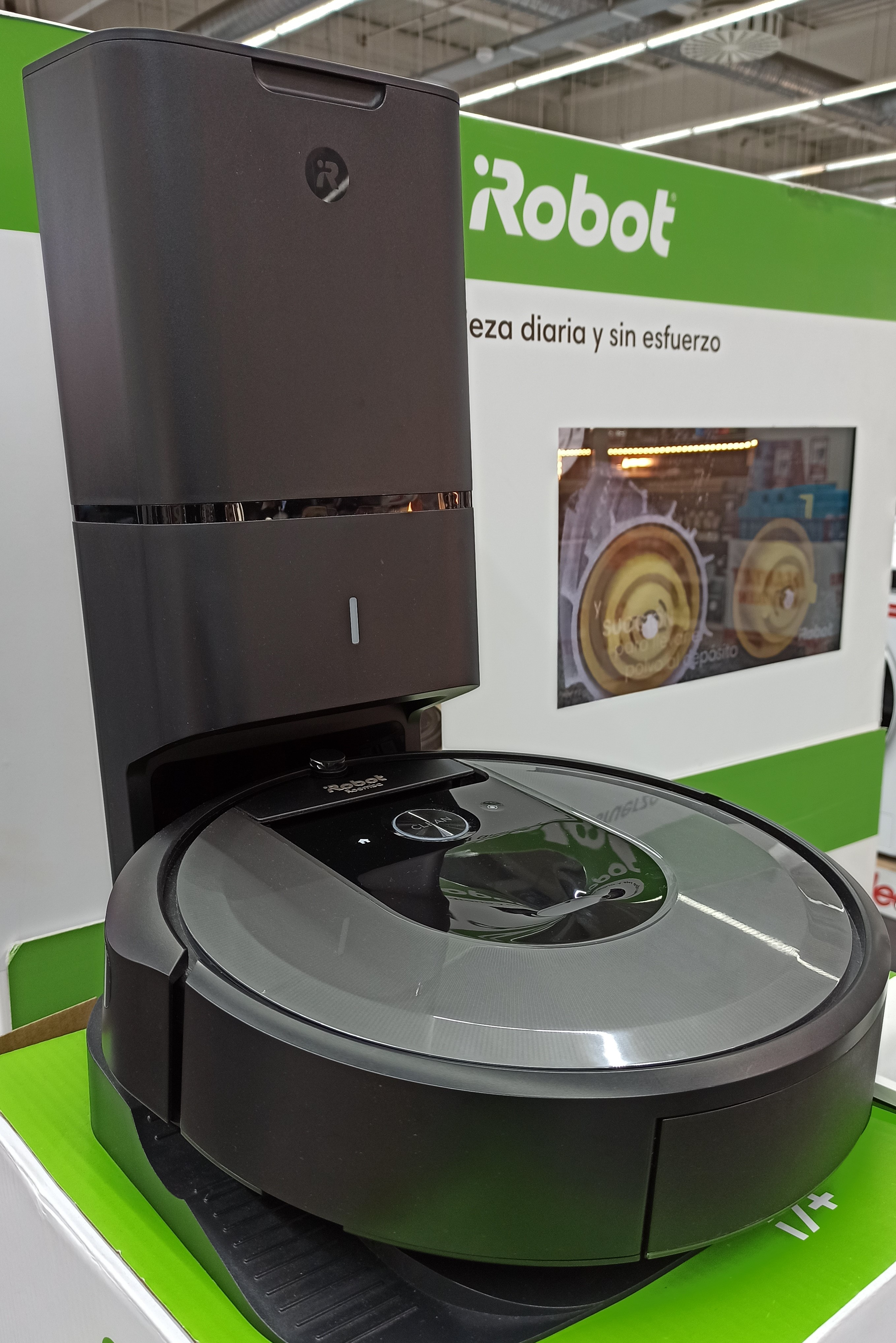
Image of an iRobot Roomba i7+ on the auto empty dock

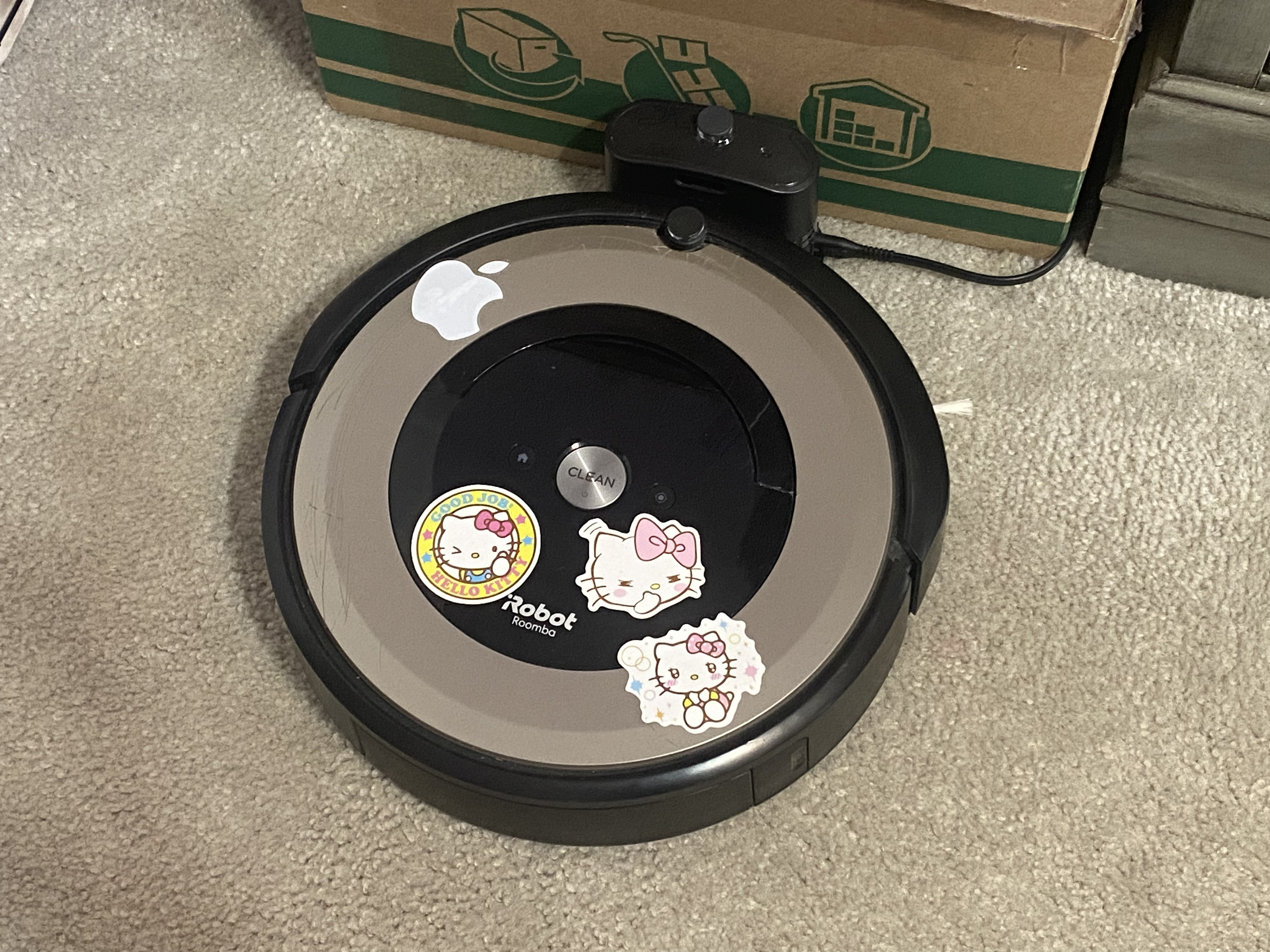
e6 model

In September 2018, iRobot introduced a new Roomba series with three models: the Roomba i7, and the more basic e5 and e6. The Roomba i7 also had a "plus" version that featured the "Clean Base Automatic Dirt Disposal Station". It could automatically self empty the dustbin without user assistance. Similarly to the 900 series, the i7 uses vSLAM navigation, but it was upgraded to the newer iAdapt 3.0 system. This new version retains the map after the Roomba has run, and uses subsequent runs to improve the map. This lets users select which room for Roomba to clean from the iRobot Home app. The i6 and i7 were criticised for being poor value.

In September 2020, iRobot released the i3, which is a lower-cost robot similar to the i7. The i3 does not use vSLAM navigation but relies on a downward optical encoder and gyroscopes; in addition, it doesn't allow selecting specific rooms, though this capability was added in 2022 with a firmware update in some regions. The i7 and i3 are compatible with the Clean Base, a base that empties the Roomba's bin into the Clean Base's internal disposable bag when it docks using a powerful vacuum. iRobot claims that the base can empty the Roomba's bin up to 30 cleaning cycles. The + in some models indicates that it includes the Clean Base. The i3 EVO model has upgraded firmware to include smart mapping functionality. The i3 received criticism for its poor navigation. The similar i4 and i5 robots, branded for European markets, were released in 2022. The i8+ was sold exclusively at Costco.

The basic e5 Roomba replaces the 800 series with an improved battery life of 60 to 90 minutes of run time on hardwood floors using a lithium-ion battery. It navigates in random patterns similar to the 6th generation and older robots. iRobot followed this with the similar e6 model. iRobot has also later released the i1 as a budget model through select retailers.

=== Eighth generation: s series ===
In late May 2019, iRobot introduced the Roomba s9 and s9+ as the "smartest, most powerful robot vacuum yet". The S series features a newly designed "D" shape and corner brush for optimized edge cleaning deep into corners and along edges. Other new features include an anti-allergen system that traps 99% of pollen, mold, and allergens, 40 times the suction compared to the 600 series, 30% wider rubber brushes, and the most advanced navigation system to date. Similar to the I series, the s9+ comes with the self-emptying Clean Base. The S series also includes linking technology (branded "Imprint") that allows the Roomba to communicate wirelessly with other iRobot products, where the Braava Jet M6 can automatically be set to mop after the s9 or other robot vacuums has finished vacuuming.

=== Ninth generation: j series ===
The j7 and j7+ models went on sale in September 2021 and debuted Precision Vision: the navigation system that detects and avoids obstacles like power cords and pet waste. The j7 is a direct upgrade to the Roomba i7, with the same overall body design and rated ten times the suction compared to the standard model. iRobot simultaneously removed the i7 from its website and it is now retired.

In September 2022, iRobot announced the Roomba Combo j7+, which is a Roomba j7+ that includes mopping capabilities with a lifting mop. Shipping began on October 4. iRobot has also released the j8+ which is a Costco exclusive variant of the j7+. On September 11, 2023, iRobot released the Roomba j9+, Combo j9+, and Combo j5. The Roomba j9+ offers 100% more suction compared to other j and i series Roombas. The Roomba Combo j9+ offers an entire new docking station with a water tank refill function added. Both j9+, Combo j9, and Combo j5 received new iRobot OS updates.

=== Tenth Generation: Max series ===
The Roomba Combo 10 Max robot was announced by iRobot on July 23, 2024, selling for $1,399.00. This model introduced a new AutoWash dock, which recharges the robot, washes and dries the mopping pad, empties debris, and self-cleans.

=== Floor cleaning models ===
iRobot announced their new series and robots on March 11, 2025. They released five new robots. They opened pre-sale for the robots on March 18, 2025, able to purchase in North American and select European markets. Retail stores will begin introducing the floor cleaning models on March 23, 2025. Each at a different price range and some offering the AutoWash™ dock along with some adding new features.

=== Other variants ===
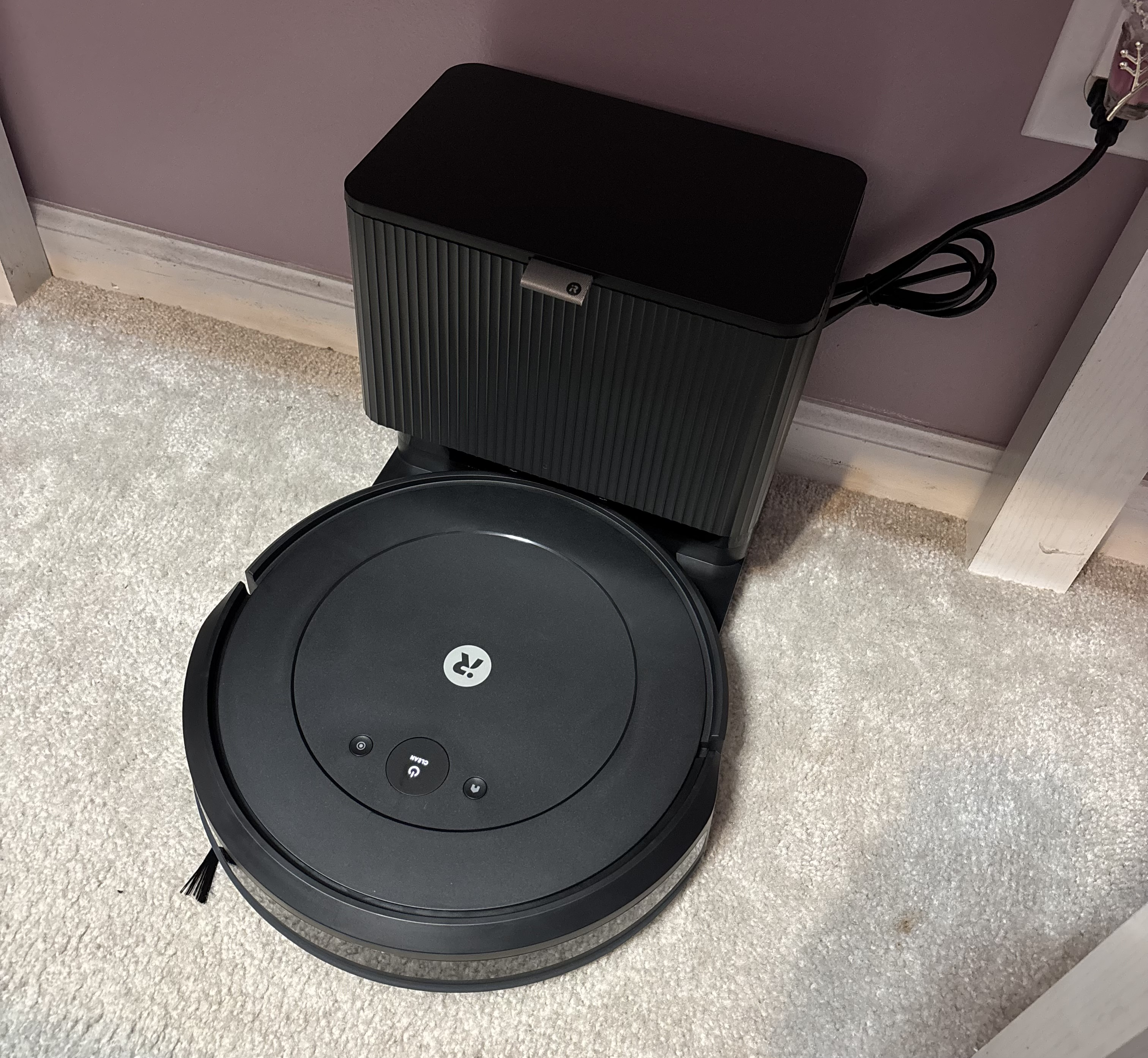
A Roomba Combo 2 Essential, which comes with the AutoEmpty dock

iRobot has also released Roomba variants that do not fall into the traditional generation classifications. These variants typically have their own naming conventions, and/or have different architectures. The earliest known variant is the r1, released in 2021. The r1 contained two side brushes instead of one, one main roller instead of two, and a removable mop pad.

In April 2023, iRobot announced the Roomba Combo Essential Robot, which also included a single main roller and a removable mop pad. This was later followed by the Roomba Vac Essential, which is the same robot without the mopping attachment.

== Programming ==
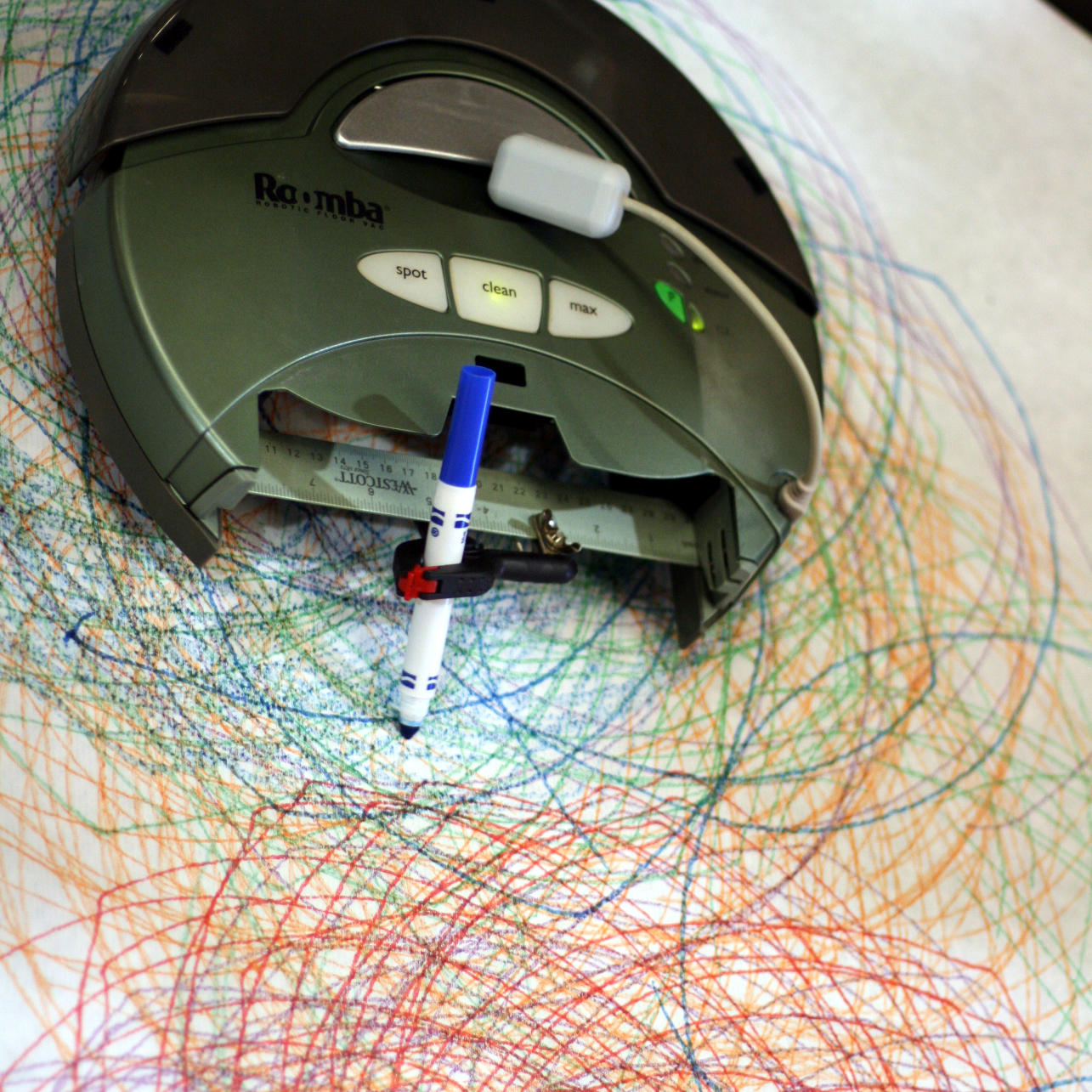
A hacked Roomba drawing a Spirograph-like pattern

From the earliest models on, Roomba vacuum cleaning robots have been hacked to extend their functionality. The first adaptations were based on a microcontroller that was directly connected to the motor drivers and sensors. Versions manufactured after October 2005 contain an electronic and software interface that allows hackers to more easily control or modify behavior and remotely monitor its sensors. One early application was using the device to map a room. The native code for Roomba is written in a dialect of Lisp.

Models with an interface (400 series since October 2007 plus 500 and 700 series) come with a Mini-DIN connector supporting a serial interface, which is electrically and physically incompatible with standard PC/Mac serial ports and cables. However, third-party adapters are available to access the Roomba's computer via Bluetooth, USB, or RS-232 (PC/Mac serial). Roombas pre-October 2005 upgraded with the OSMO hacker device allow monitoring many sensors and modifying the unit's behavior. The Roomba Open Interface (OI, formerly Roomba Serial Command Interface) allows programmers and roboticists to create their own enhancements.

In response to the growing interest of hackers in their product, the company developed the iRobot Create. In this model, the vacuum cleaner motor is replaced by a "cargo bay" for mounting devices like TV cameras, lasers and other robotic parts. It provides a greatly enhanced 25-pin interface providing both analog and digital bidirectional communication with the hosted device allowing use as the mobile base for completely new robots. Together with a computing platform like a netbook or handheld device with wireless networking, it can be remotely controlled through a network.

== See also ==
- Braava
- Domestic robot
- Indoor positioning system
- Robotics suite
- Scooba (brand)
