= Carol Smallwood =

American poet and writer

- Born: May 3, 1939 (age 87); Cheboygan, Michigan
- Education: Eastern Michigan University (BS); Western Michigan University
- Occupation: Librarian
- Writing career
- Genres: poet, creative nonfiction, fiction
- Notable awards: National Federation of State Poetry Societies Award

Carol Smallwood (born May 3, 1939) is an American poet and writer.

== Early life and education ==
Carol Smallwood was born May 3, 1939, in Cheboygan, Michigan to teachers Lloyd and Lucy Gouine. She received her Bachelor of Science degree from Eastern Michigan University in 1961 followed by a master's degree in Art in 1963, and MLA Library Science degree from Western Michigan University in 1976.

Married in 1963 and divorced in 1976, Smallwood has two children.

== Career ==
Smallwood began working in the education and library administration fields in 1961. She has written non-fiction books for libraries with the intention of providing public and higher-education libraries with strategies and tested programs to encourage patron interaction.

She stated in an interview that her first book "came from teachers asking where to get materials", and that she started writing poetry after being told her "chan[c]es were slim of surviving cancer".

== Awards ==
- National Federation of State Poetry Societies Award
- Franklin-Christoph Poetry Contest Winner
- ByLine 1st Place for First Chapter of a Novel

== Selected publications ==
=== Fiction ===
- A Ceremony, The Head & The Hand Press, 2014. OCLC 890940941

=== Non-fiction ===
- Library Partnerships With Writers and Poets: Case Studies (joint author with Vera Gubnitskaia), McFarland & Company, 2017. ISBN 978-1476665399
- Interweavings: Creative Nonfiction, Shanti Arts Publishing, 2017. ISBN 9781941830468
- The Complete Guide to Using Google in Libraries: Volume 1 Instruction, Administration and Staff Productivity, Volume 2 (editor), McFarland & Company, 2015. ISBN 978-1442246904 ISBN 978-1442247888
- Creative Management of Small Public Libraries in the 21st Century, Rowman & Littlefield, 2014. ISBN 978-1442243576
- Writing After Retirement: Tips From Successful Retired Writers (joint editor with Christine Redman-Waldeyer), Rowman & Littlefield, 2014. ISBN 978-1442238305
- Library Services for Multicultural Patrons: Strategies to Encourage Library Use (joint editor with Kim Becnel), Scarecrow Press, 2013. ISBN 978-0810887220
- Continuing Education for Librarians: Essays on Career Improvement through Classes, Workshops, Conferences and More, McFarland & Company, 2013. ISBN 978-0786468867
- Women on Poetry: Writing, Revising, Publishing and Teaching (joint editor with Colleen S. Harris, and Cynthia Brackett-Vincent), McFarland & Company, 2012. ISBN 978-0786463923
- How to Thrive as a Solo Librarian (joint editor with Melissa J. Clapp), Scarecrow Press, 2011. ISBN 978-0810882133
- The Frugal Librarian: Thriving in Tough Economic Times, 2011.
- Contemporary American Women: Our Defining Passages (joint editor with Cynthia Brackett-Vincent), All Things That Matter Press, 2009. ISBN 978-0984259434
- Librarians as Community Partners: An Outreach Handbook, ALA Editions, 2009.
- Insider's Guide to School Libraries: Tips and Resources, Linworth Publishing, 1997. ISBN 978-0938865612
- A Guide to Selected Federal Agency Programs and Publications for Librarians and Teachers, Libraries Umlimited Inc, 1986. ISBN 978-0872875289

=== Novels ===
- Lily's Odyssey, All Things That Matter Press, 2010. ISBN 9780984098453

=== Poetry ===
- On the Way to Wendy's, Pudding House Publications, 2008. ISBN 978-1589986459
- Patterns : Moments in Time. Word Poetry. 28 February 2019. ISBN 978-1625493057.
- Poetry A Matter of Selection, Poetic Matrix Press, 2018. ISBN 0998146986
- Prisms, Particles, and Refractions, Finishing Line Press, 2017. ISBN 978-1635342338
- In Hubble's Shadow, Shanti Arts Publishing, 2017. ISBN 9781941830444
- Divining the Prime Meridian, WordTech Editions, 2015. ISBN 9781625491114
- Water, Earth, Air, Fire, and Picket Fences, Lamar University Press, 2014. ISBN 9780991107483
- Compartments: Poems on Nature, Femininity and Other Realms, Anaphora Literary Press, 2011. ISBN 9781681141848
- Smallwood, Carol (2018). In the Measuring. Shanti Arts. ISBN 978-1-947067-38-7.
- Visits and Other Passages, Finishing Line Press, January 2019. ISBN 1635348005
- Chronicles in Passage, Poetic Matrix Press, August 2019. ISBN 978-1733702539
- Thread, Form, and Other Enclosures, Main Street Rag Publishing, October 2020. ISBN 9781599488127
- The Illusiveness of Gray, Kelsay Books, May 2021. ISBN 9781954353367
