= Electrolux Trilobite =

First commercially available robotic vacuum cleaner

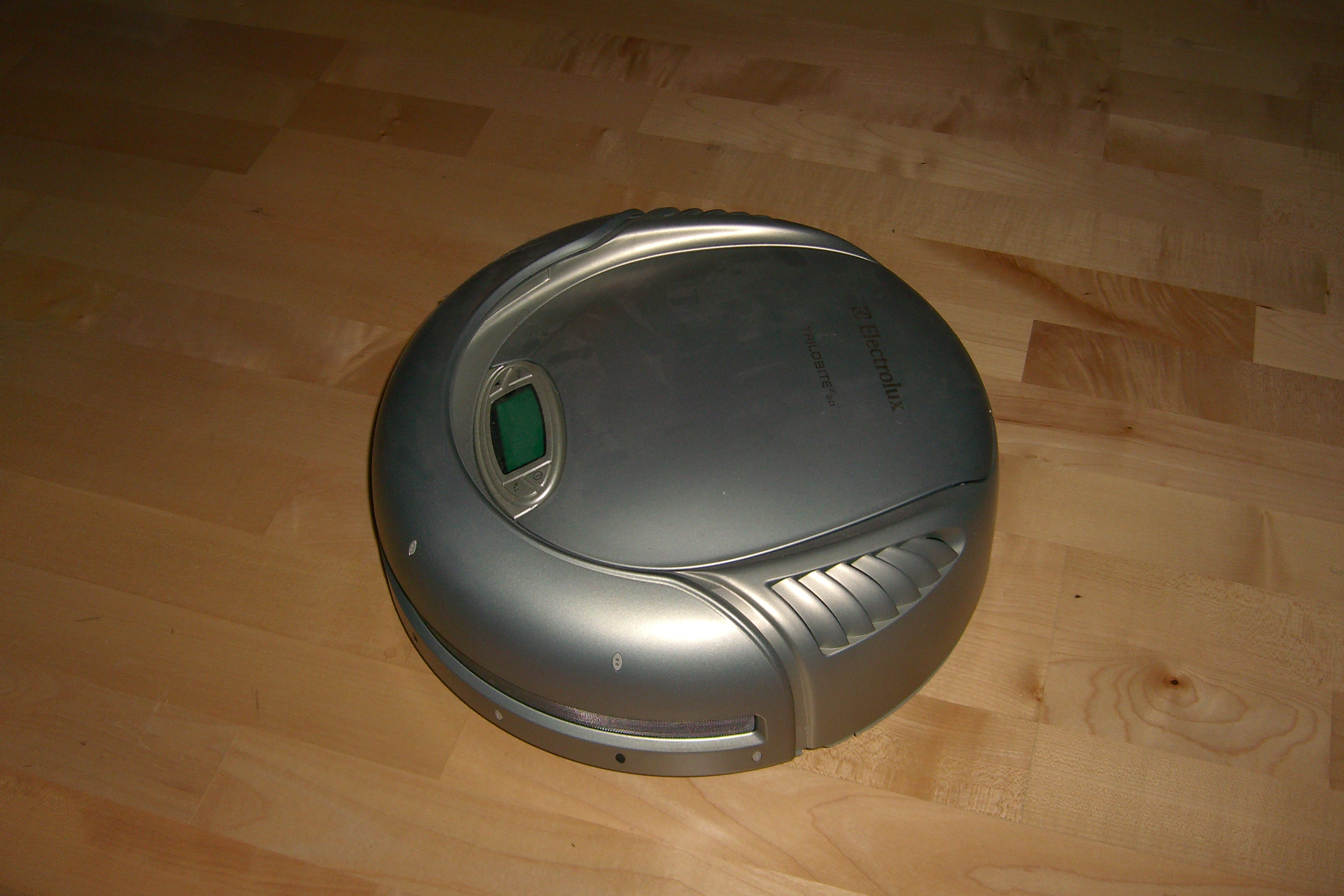
A silver Trilobite Version 2.0

The Electrolux Trilobite is a robotic vacuum cleaner manufactured by the Swedish corporation Electrolux. First demonstrated as a prototype in 1996, the Trilobite was released in 2001, becoming the first commercially available robot vacuum. The device takes its name from the extinct arthropod, which scoured the ocean's floor.

== History ==
A prototype cleaner was first seen on an episode of the BBC television programme Tomorrow's World presented by Philippa Forrester, which aired on 10 May 1996. The product was formally announced on 1 December 1997.

In 2001, Trilobite was launched. Model ZA1 was the world's first commercially available autonomous vacuum cleaner. The Trilobite cost around $1,500.

The second generation was released as Version 2.0 in 2004, model ZA2. It was developed in 2003.

== Description ==
Trilobite had a weight of about 2 kg, a diameter of 35 cm, and a height of 13 cm. It features a number of casters in addition to the drive wheels. The robot has a run time of about an hour between recharging. The robot uses a semi-structured approach to traversal of rooms. The robot comes with a recharging circuit that allows extended operation for hours at a time.

The Trilobite contains a vacuum cleaner and a removable roller brush capable of working on deep-pile carpet. It has the ability to map rooms and avoid obstacles by using ultrasonic sensors and Mark 2 model also had a infrared. It recharges itself on a charging base, which it automatically finds when has completed its cleaning task or its power runs low. The Trilobite will indicate when the dustbin needs to be emptied.

Its ultrasonic sensors allow it to come within 1" of objects without colliding with them. This object detection is fairly reliable, but sometimes fails if the robot approaches an object with a sharp corner. In this case, the ultrasonic beam is not reflected, and the Trilobite will gently bump into the object. Because the Trilobite stops a short distance from walls and other objects, it leaves small areas that are not fully cleaned. The robot will drive around the boundary of the room and upon completion of the cycle it will move at random through the rest of the room.

Magnetic strips are used to block off areas that the Trilobite should not enter, and infrared sensors (on the Mark 2 model) protect it from falling down stairs or off ledges.

Electrolux has discontinued the Trilobite, removing any product information from its website, referencing instead its Wikipedia page for information.

In September 2016, Electrolux introduced the successor to the Trilobite, the MotionSense. An international version of the teaser video was released on January 9, 2017.

=== Patents describing features of the Trilobite ===
- WO 02067744 (A1) Wheel support arrangement for an autonomous cleaning apparatus.
- WO/1997/040734 Autonomous device.
- USPTO 7647144 Obstacle sensing system for an autonomous cleaning apparatus.
- US5935179A System and device for a self orienting device (the ultrasonic detection system)

== See also ==
- Domestic robots
- Mobile robot
- Robotic mapping
- Robotic vacuum cleaner
