= Robotic vacuum cleaner =

Autonomous vacuum floor cleaning system

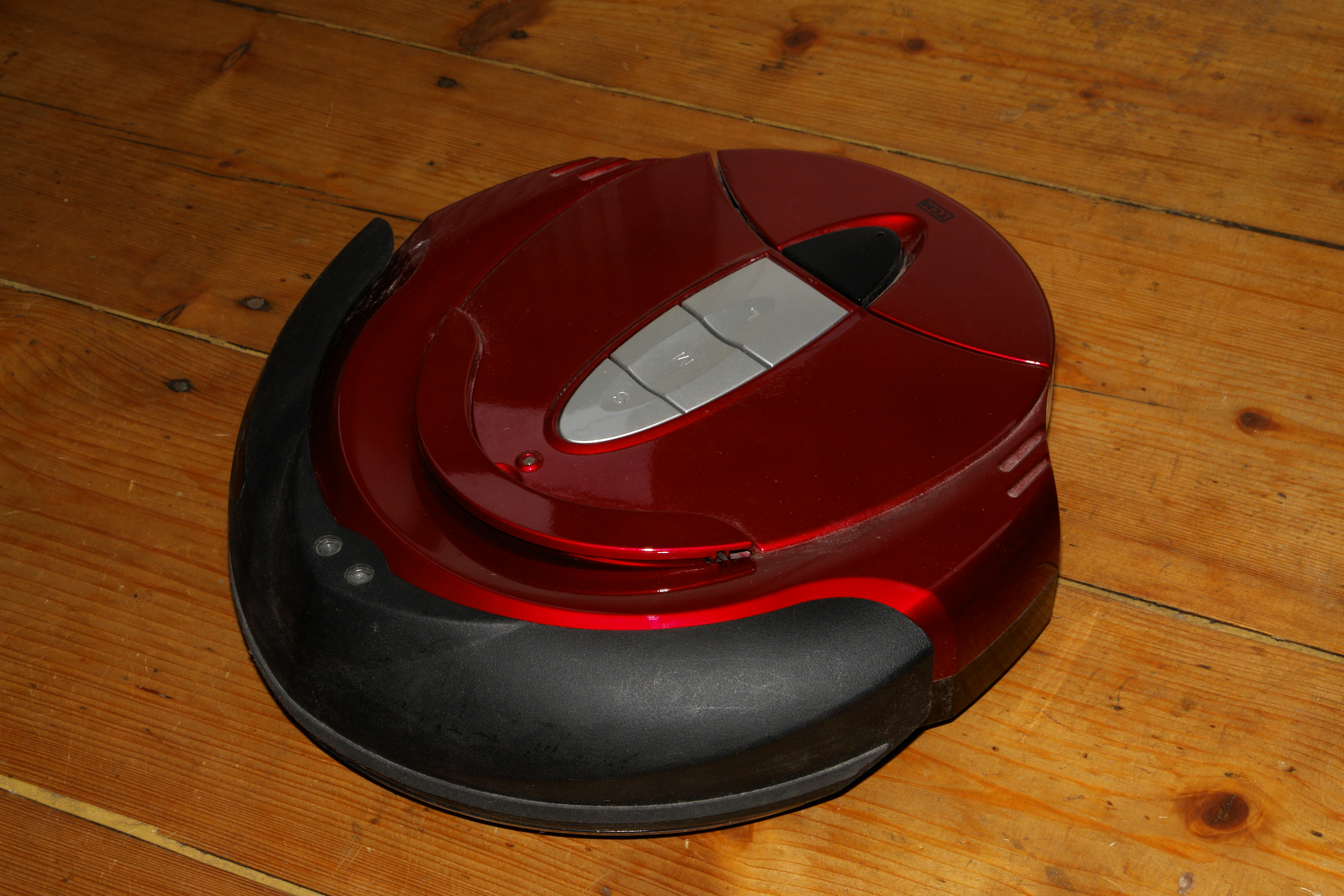
A cleaning robot from 2006

Robotic vacuum cleaner on a hardwood floor.

A robotic vacuum cleaner, sometimes called a robovac, is a self-propelled vacuum cleaner which has sensors and robotic drives, programmable controllers, and cleaning routines. Early designs included manual operation via remote control and a "self-drive" mode which allowed the machine to clean autonomously.

== History ==
In 1956, the American science fiction author Robert A. Heinlein described the concept of a robotic vacuum cleaner with a recharging dock in his novel The Door into Summer: "Basically it was just a better vacuum cleaner .... It went quietly looking for dirt all day long, in search curves that could miss nothing .... Around dinner time it would go to its stall and soak up a quick charge." The following year engineer Donald Moore filed a patent for robotic appliances, including a sweeper, that could follow a track laid below the floor. Whirlpool demonstrated the concept at the 1959 American National Exhibition but did not bring it to market.

In 1969 an episode of The Avengers was broadcast in which the character Inge Tilson played by Dora Reisser says "...I saw a demonstration once. A robot vacuum cleaner. It swept around the house, went back into its cupboard, automatically plugged in and recharged itself...". The teleplay for this episode which was entitled "Thingumajig" was written by Terry Nation. It was episode 27 of Season 7.

In 1985, Tomy released the Dustbot as a part of their Omnibot line of toys. Dustbot was the first robot to feature a built in vacuum, and was able to turn when it sensed an edge or ran into something. Dustbot would carry a mini broom and dustpan for decoration.

In 1990, three roboticists, Colin Angle, Helen Greiner, and Rodney Brooks, founded iRobot. It was originally dedicated to making robots for military and domestic use. It launched the Roomba in 2002, which was able to change direction when it encountered an obstacle, detect dirty spots on the floor, and identify steep drops to keep it from falling down stairs. The Roomba proved to be the first commercially successful robot vacuum. In 2005, iRobot introduced the Scooba, which scrubbed hard floors.

In 1996, Electrolux introduced the first robotic vacuum cleaner, the Electrolux Trilobite. It worked well but had frequent problems with colliding with objects and stopping short of walls and other objects, as well as leaving small areas not cleaned. As a result, it failed in the market and was discontinued. In 1997, one of Electrolux's first versions of the Trilobite vacuum was featured on the BBC's science program, Tomorrow's World.

In 2001, Dyson built and demonstrated a robot vacuum known as the DC06. However, due to its high price, it was never released to the market. Electrolux released the Trilobite robotic vacuum cleaner. The Robotic vacuum cleaner launched at a price of $1,800.00. There were two models: the ZA1 and the ZA2.

In 2010, Neato Robotics introduced the XV-11, one of the first robot vacuums to utilize laser-based mapping that allowed for navigation in systematic straight lines rather than random navigation.

In 2015, Dyson and iRobot both introduced camera-based mapping.

In 2016, iRobot claimed that 20% of vacuum cleaners sales worldwide were robots.

In 2021, iRobot claimed to have sold more than 40 million robots worldwide.

== Main features ==
=== Cleaning modes ===
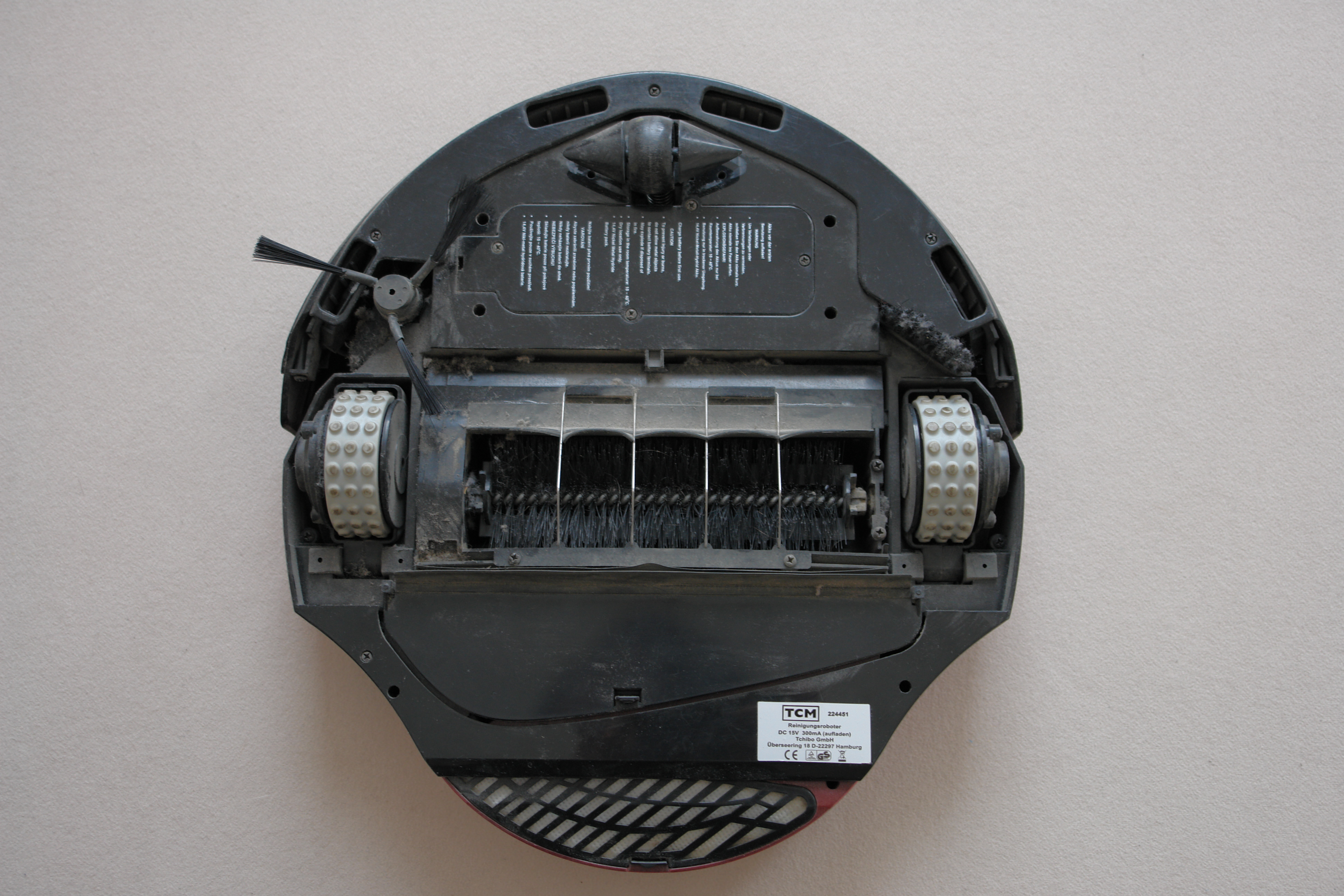
A cleaning robot as seen from below

Robotic vacuums offer different types of cleaning modes, allowing them to target specific areas or clean more generally, either under direct human control or automatically.

=== Wet mopping ===
Some models can also mop for wet cleaning, autonomously vacuuming and wet-mopping a floor in one pass (sweep and mop combo).

The mop is either manually wet before attachment to the bottom of the robot or the robot may be able to automatically spray water on to the floor before running over it.

Some advanced robot vacuum cleaners have a sensor that detects and avoids mopping in carpeted areas. However, if there is no sensor, most of the robot vacuum cleaner manufacturers add a no-mop zone feature in the app to make robot vacuums to avoid certain areas to clean. These robot vacuums are also capable to mop about 150 m^{2} (1,600 sq ft) in one go.

=== Others ===
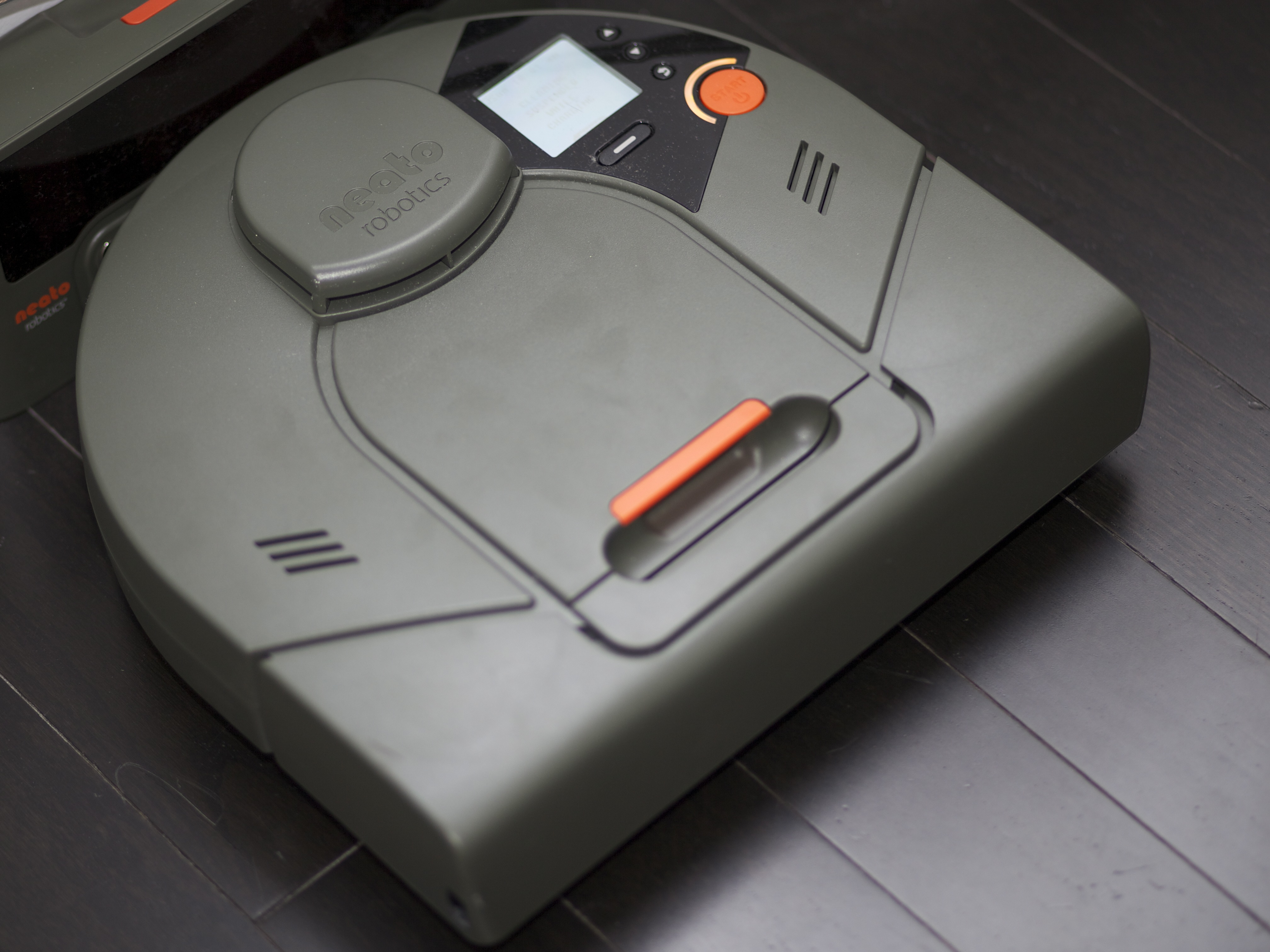
D-shape vacuum cleaner

Anti-drop
Most robots include anti-drop and anti-bump IR sensors.
Connected app
Some models allow control of the unit using an app over a WiFi connection from the user's smartphone or connected home automation device, e.g. Amazon Alexa and the Google Assistant.
Software upgrades
Some units are able to receive over-the-air (OTA) firmware updates.
HEPA filters
HEPA air filters are industry-standard now for robot vacuum cleaners. These remove dust and pollen from the air.
Video camera, speakers, microphone
Some units can be used to record and monitor their surroundings as a mobile, internet connected security camera. Make voice or video calls, act as alarms and have voice command functionality.
Self cleaning
Some units have dustbin self emptying via another vacuum in the charging station. Mop self wash, scrub, auto clean water refill and dirty water sucked into grey water tank. No user interaction needed for weeks or months at a time.
Robotic arm
Used to lift and move items to another location.

== Pros and Cons ==
Marketing materials for robotic vacuums frequently cite low - mid noise (59 and 77 decibels (dB)), plug and play, and autonomous cleaning as main advantages. The perception that these devices are set-and-forget solutions is widespread but not always correct. Robotic vacuums are usually smaller than traditional upright vacuums, and weigh significantly less than even the lightest canister models. However, a downside to a robotic vacuum cleaner is that it takes an extended amount of time to vacuum an area due to its size. They are also relatively expensive, and replacement parts and batteries can contribute significantly to their operating cost. Concerns over privacy and security have also been raised around robotic vacuums.

== See also ==
- Automated pool cleaner
- Domestic robots
- Mobile robot
- Open-source robotics
- Robotic mapping
- Wireless sensor network
