= Scooba (brand) =

Cleaning robot made by iRobot Corporation

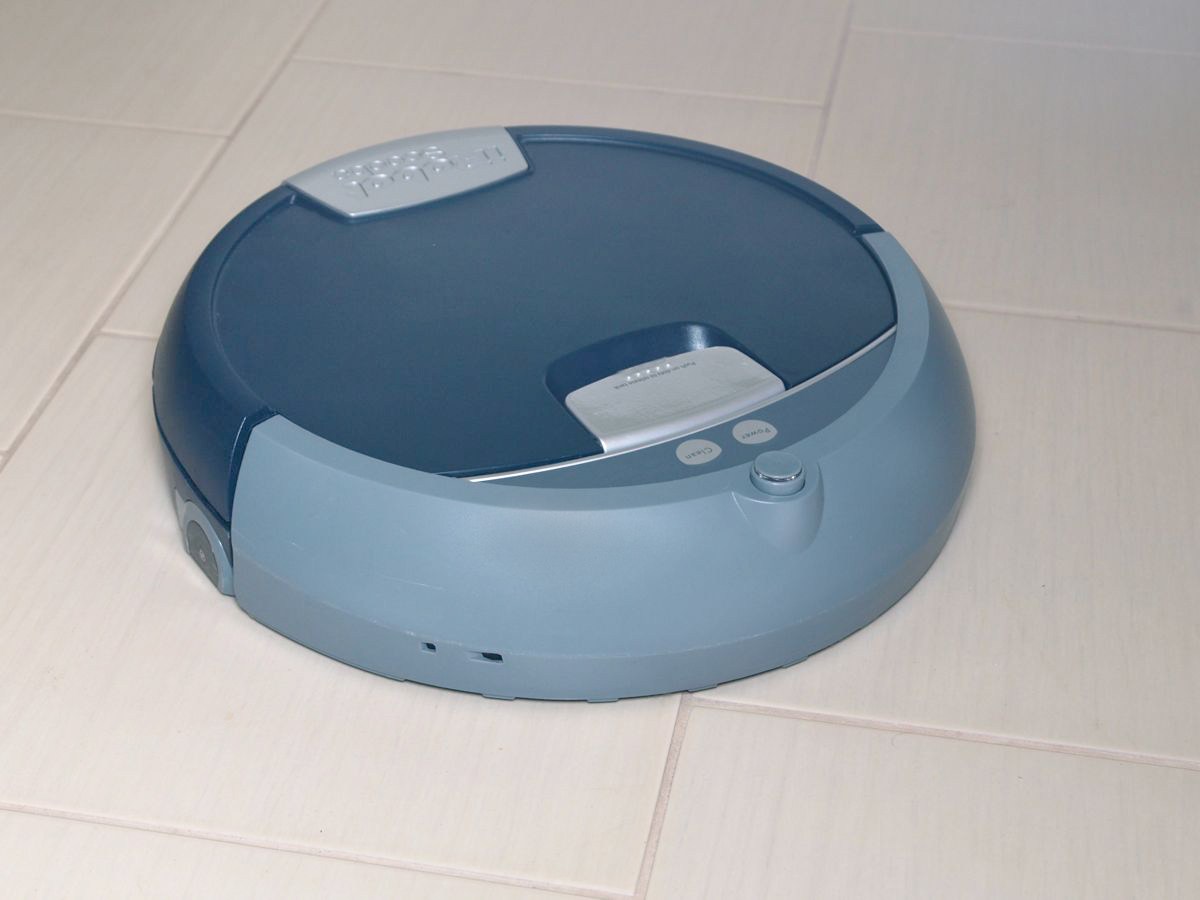
- iRobot Scooba 380 floor washing robot
- Type: floor-scrubbing robot
- Manufacturer: iRobot
- Available: 2006 to 2016
- Website: http://www.robotmart.ru/catalog/display/157

Scooba was a floor-scrubbing robot made by iRobot. It was released in limited numbers in December 2005 for the Christmas season, with full production starting in early 2006. The company introduced a lower-priced version, the Scooba 5800, in the second half of 2006. It introduced a new Scooba 450 at CES 2014 in January 2014.

By 2016, the Scooba line of floor-scrubbers were phased out in favor of the Braava line of floor-mopping robots.

== Operation ==
The Scooba used either a special non-bleach cleaning solution named "Scooba juice" (made by the Clorox Company) formulated to clean the floors while discouraging rust or wheel slippage, or the newer Scooba Natural Enzyme cleaning solution. The robot prepared the floor by vacuuming loose debris, squirted clean solution on the floor, scrubbed the floor, and then sucked up the dirty solution leaving a nearly dry floor behind. The robot was safe to use on sealed hardwood floors and most other hard household surfaces, but could not be used on rugs. Scooba avoided cleaning rugs and stairs, and could clean about 200 square feet (19 m^{2}) on a single tank-load of solution.

Some models of the Scooba included an iRobot Virtual Wall accessory, which projected a beam of infrared light, setting a boundary which the robot would not cross.

The Scooba was the second major commercial product made by iRobot, which popularized vacuum robots with the Roomba. It was available in over 40 countries.

== Systems ==
The Scooba used approximately 2 US fluid ounces (59 ml) of cleaning solution per cycle, mixed with 32 US fluid ounces (950 ml) of water to fill the cleaning solution tank. The Scooba came with four packets of the new "Natural Enzyme" cleaning solution, enough for about four washes. Additional Clorox cleaning solution comes in five- and nine-packs of 32 US fluid ounces (950 ml) bottles, which provided enough solution for about 16 washings per bottle. Polysorbate 20 and tetrapotassium EDTA were the primary ingredients. Some Scooba models could also use white vinegar or plain water in place of the proprietary solution.

Recharge times were typically 3 hours.

== Models ==
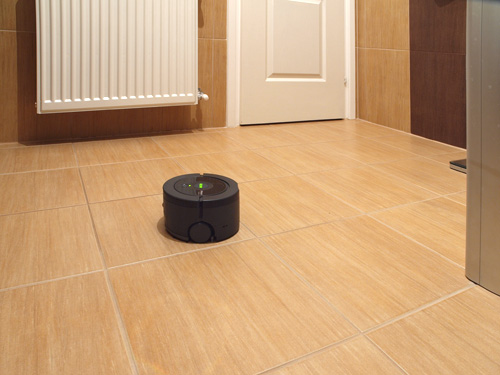
iRobot Scooba 230 floor washing robot

=== The original Scooba ===
Scooba 5900 was the first Scooba, it could be used with the Scooba Cleaning Solution, or other suitably conductive solutions, but was discontinued in favor of the Scooba 5800 version (basic floor washing model) which could also use plain water in its cleaning tank. iRobot shed several of the 5900's premium features to produce the lower-priced 5800 model. There were no changes to the basic floor cleaning machinery.

The Scooba 5800 could clean about 250 square feet (23 m^{2}) per battery charge.

=== Scooba 230 ===
Introduced in 2011, the Scooba 230 was a smaller model, less than half the diameter but taller than the previous Scooba models. The reduced diameter allowed the robot to clean more areas in small bathrooms, kitchens, and other tight spaces. In order to reduce the size, the clean water and dirty water tanks were replaced with an internal clean water bladder in a sealed compartment that holds the dirty water, allowing the dirty water storage to expand as the clean water was used up. It worked the same way as the other Scoobas, only there is no scrubbing brushes, but bristles. Only Scooba cleaning solution and water are recommended as vinegar and the original cleaning solution will damage the bladder. The initial vacuuming stage present in other Scooba models was also removed, requiring users to sweep up or vacuum loose debris to start. The Scooba 230 could clean up to 150 square feet (14 m^{2}) in one charge. The Scooba 230’s. main downfall was that it had to be charged manually and that it did not have screws to hold it together making fixing it near impossible.

=== Scooba 450 ===
The fourth generation Scooba 450 was introduced at the Consumer Electronics Show 2014. It could mop tile, wood, linoleum, and more. It uses a three-stage cleaning process. First, it sweeps and pre-soaks the floor with cleaning solution, and then it scrubs the floor and squeegees the dirty solution.

== Discontinuation ==
iRobot launched the Braava line of floor mopping robots in 2013, which eventually replaced the Scooba brand by 2016.
