= Christopher Wright (author) =

American writer

- Born: November 24, 1964 (age 61); Pontiac, Michigan, U.S.
- Occupation: Novelist
- Writing career
- Pen name: Johnathan Rand, Christopher Knight
- Genres: Teen Horror, Thrillers
- Notable works: American Chillers series, Michigan Chillers
- Website: americanchillers.com

Christopher Wright, born November 24, 1964, in Pontiac, Michigan, is the author of dozens of horror fiction books for children and young adults. He writes under the pseudonyms Johnathan Rand and Christopher Knight. Almost all of Wright's books (except American Chillers) take place in his home state of Michigan.

== Biography ==
Wright grew up in Waterford Michigan, until his family moved to Grayling after his 4th Grade year of school. He lived for a short time in Houghton Lake before moving to Petoskey for six years, then to a little cabin in the woods outside of Cheboygan before moving to Topinabee (about 25 miles directly south of the Mackinac Bridge) with his wife and two dogs named "Jelly Bean" and "Brody".

Wright's first novel, The Laurentian Channel, was written in 1995 and was accepted by an unknown publisher. However, the publication process took far too long, and during the time, he wrote his real first novel, St. Helena. The book was published exclusively as an audiobook in 1997, and the following year, it was published as trade paperback. In 2007, Wright became involved in exposing a case of animal cruelty, and documented the case on a website called "Thor's Warriors", a website that shows hidden animal abuse and cruelty cases to the public.

== Chillermania ==
Wright owns his own bookstore, Chillermania!, in Indian River, Michigan. The store mostly sells merchandise related to his American Chillers and Michigan Chillers books; however, his other works and memorabilia may be purchased there as well. The products for sale include his books, clothing, hats, autographs, and various other items. Wright is not always present at his store, but has been known to visit frequently.

== Selected works ==
Under the pseudonym Johnathan Rand

- American Chillers series
- Michigan Chillers series
- Freddie Fernortner, Fearless First Grader series
- Adventure Club series

Under the pseudonym Christopher Knight

- St. Helena (1997)
- Ferocity (1999)
- Bestseller (2000)
- The Laurentian Channel (2001)
- Season of the Witch (2003)
- The World is Black and White (2008)

Under both Johnathan Rand and Christopher Knight

- Pandemia

== Publication ==
Wright has opted to self-publish, originally driving with his wife to gas stations, restaurants, gift shops, and hotels to sell the books. In 2003, the author stated that they had sold over one million copies of the books.

Wright uses two pseudonyms when writing — Johnathan Rand for the children's books, and Christopher Knight for the books aimed at adults.

When asked out of the books he had written what his favorite one was, Wright said it was Dinosaurs Destroy Detroit, but that he liked each one in a unique way.
