= Max Ellison =

American poet

Max Ellison (1914–1985) was an American poet who was born in Bellaire, Michigan. Ellison attended Bellaire High School for two years. During the Second World War, he served in the US Army's 1st Cavalry Division in the Philippines and was awarded the Purple Heart. After the war he became a hog farmer in Plymouth, Michigan. In 1967, he left farming and returned to Bellaire to write poetry. There he lived in a small wooden cabin without plumbing, electricity, or a telephone. He travelled extensively, performing poetry recitations in numerous schools and colleges. His poems were said to be, "earthy, direct and naturalistic." While another reviewer noted, "When speaking, his deep, rolling voice draws out the lyrical quality of strong simple images and the musical meter of his own and others' poetry." He recited his poem, "Michigan," at the first inauguration of Michigan Governor William Milliken. In 1973, he represented the United States at an international poetry festival held at the University of Massachusetts. Ellison published several books of poetry including The Underbark, The Happenstance, and Double Take.
