= Fido explosives detector =

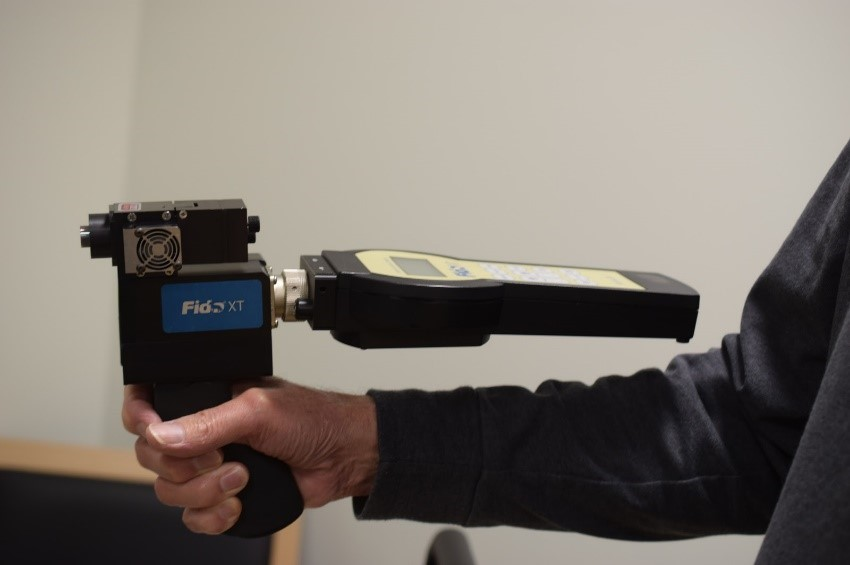
The Fido XT Portable Explosives Detector

The Fido explosives detector is a battery-powered, handheld sensory device that uses amplifying fluorescent polymer (AFP) materials to detect trace levels of high explosives like trinitrotoluene (TNT). It was developed by Nomadics, a subsidiary of ICX Technologies (now owned by FLIR Systems), in the early 2000s as part of the Defense Advanced Research Projects Agency's (DARPA) Dog's Nose program. The Fido explosives detector is considered the first artificial nose capable of detecting landmines in the real world. The device was named after its ability to detect explosive vapors at concentrations of parts per quadrillion (1 in 10^15), which is comparable to the sensitivity of a bomb-sniffing dog's nose, i.e. the historical "gold standard" for finding concealed explosives.

== Overview ==
The Fido explosives detector functions as a trace explosives detector through its use of a specially-made fluorescent polymer film that is extremely sensitive to molecules of TNT, which can be found in more than 85 percent of deployed landmines.

The thin film consists of many repeating chains of amplifying fluorescent polymers that naturally emit visible light when exposed to ultraviolet rays. The fluorescence is the result of excited state electrons (i.e. excitons) travelling down the polymer backbone and between adjacent polymer chains upon absorbing a photon of light. However, the fluorescence reactions become quenched the moment an electron-deficient molecule such as TNT binds to the polymer and traps the migrating exciton at the binding site. A single molecule of TNT is capable of diminishing the fluorescence of entire polymer chains in the thin film, thereby amplifying the effect of a single TNT binding event that may bypass the detection of less-sensitive molecular sensors. The design of the thin film allows the TNT molecules to bind anywhere along the polymer chain, drastically increasing the number of opportunities for the TNT binding event to occur. The amplifying fluorescent polymers used in the Fido explosives detector were engineered to be preferentially responsive to nitroaromatic explosives. The binding of the TNT molecules is believed to be caused by an electrostatic-type interaction between the polymer and the target analyte. Selectivity can also be improved by synthesizing structures into the polymer that are electrostatic mirror images of the desired target analytes. According to reports, there is evidence that the polymers can amplify the quenching of the fluorescence reactions between 100- and 1000-fold compared to conventional quenching mechanisms.

The fluorescent polymer film is coated on the interior surface of the tiny glass tubes that the Fido explosives detector use to draw in air. A blue light-emitting diode (LED) inside the detector serves to excite fluorescent polymer electrons, and the detector's photomultiplier tubes amplifies and reads the wavelength of the emitted light in order to discern whether the light produced by the polymer film had dimmed. The Fido explosives detector provides near real-time, almost instantaneous analysis of the sampled air by registering the intensity of the photomultiplier tubes, which is inversely proportional to the mass of analyte that binds to the polymer films. The polymer films can be exposed repeatedly to samples due to the reversible nature of the binding of the analytes to the film. The Fido explosives detector can return the fluorescence intensity of the polymer films to near the initial baseline reading by drawing in a new flow of clean air to sweep over the polymer film and desorb the analyte.

== History ==
The invention of the Fido explosives detector relied heavily on the invention of the amplifying fluorescent polymer (AFP) in the late 1990s. At the time, the use of fluorescent polymers in their solid state was difficult due to their significantly decreased sensitivity and fluorescence compared to polymers in solution. In 1995, chemist Timothy Swager at the Massachusetts Institute of Technology (MIT) was the first to demonstrate the possibility of sensory signal amplification using the molecular wire approach. This technique was later used by Swager to develop AFPs for the first time. Soon afterwards, Swager was awarded a U.S. military research grant to incorporate AFPs into anti-mine technology as part of DARPA's Unexploded Ordnance Detection Program, which was also more informally known as the Dog's Nose program. He licensed the AFP technology to Nomadics and worked with the company to create a prototype of the fluorescent polymers that could be used for explosives detection.

The first field tests of the early prototypes of the Fido explosives detector were conducted in 1999 at Fort Leonard Wood, MO. In 2001, a variant of the Fido explosives detector known as the SeaDog was developed to detect trace amounts of TNT underwater. The SeaDog was then integrated onto an autonomous underwater vehicle (AUV) as part of the U.S. Navy Office of Naval Research's Chemical Sensing in the Marine Environment (CSME) program, becoming the first to demonstrate the mapping of an explosive plume underwater in real time. In 2002, Nomadics was funded by the Strategic Environmental Research and Development Program (SERDP) to configure the Fido explosives detector so that it could be used to monitor explosives contamination of groundwater. The system was further modified and field tested by different organizations within the U.S. Department of Defense, including the U.S. Army Research Laboratory (ARL) and the Night Vision and Electronic Sensors Directorate (NVESD).

The Fido explosives detector was promoted by Nomadics as a low-cost system since most of the hardware, aside from the AFP, consists of commercial off-the-shelf (COTS) electronic and optical components. Unlike most fluorescent quenching explosive sensors, the device did not require solid-state lasers and was not as tightly restrained by thermal stability requirements. In 2003, Nomadics determined that incorporating a two-element array sensor into the Fido explosives detector had the potential to greatly improve the device's ability to discriminate chemical signature compounds from potential chemical interferents without any loss in sensor sensitivity.

By 2004, funding from the Army Research Office (ARO) led to the development of a miniature handheld prototype of the Fido explosives detector that was capable of operating for about six hours on a single rechargeable battery. The production of this system made use of cheaper and more rugged components, such as replacing the photomultiplier with a less sensitive photodiode. These changes resulted in an increase in the noise level that the researchers note would likely not be significant for most applications.

In 2005, Swager and his team found that adjusting the pump power to just over the required threshold for lasing significantly attenuated the lasing emission, resulting in a thirtyfold increase in the sensitivity of Fido explosives detector sensors when the system is operating near the lasing threshold. In the same year, Nomadics marketed a new version of the device known as the Fido XT Explosives Detector, which featured a tethered extension that allowed the sampling head that collected the traces of explosive compounds to be separated from the rest of the device. The XT variant also incorporated a preconcentrator that allowed the device to sample 1000 liters of air at the same time as it would take for the device to sample 1 liter of air without the enhancement. This new addition made it possible for the device to detect the source of the vapor without having the sensor come in physical contact with the contaminated item.

Throughout its continued development, the Fido explosives detector underwent numerous modifications by the U.S. military to be mounted on various types of platforms in order to detect traces of explosive vapors in dangerous environments and hard-to-reach areas. One prominent example was the plan to integrate the Fido explosives detector on robotic platforms in order to remotely detect improvised explosive devices (IEDs). Initially proposed by the then-Assistant Secretary of the Army for Acquisition, Logistics and Technology (ASAALT), the project was spearheaded by the Joint IED Defeat Task Force (JIEDDTF) as part of a 90-day delivery schedule that promised to produce ten integrated systems for soldiers in combat spaces. After much deliberation, iRobot's PackBot was selected as the robotic platform for the Fido explosives detector. However, due to challenges with cost and time restrictions, only half of the proposed ten prototype units were ultimately produced, tested, and fielded in Afghanistan and Iraq. While the fielded prototypes encountered technical problems that hindered performance, repairs by teams of scientists from different Army labs were able to resolve much of the arising issues. Other efforts included the development of Neural Robotics, Inc.'s AutoCopter, which had the detector mounted on a small, unmanned helicopter platform, as well as the integration of the detection system into the Foster-Miller TALON and the U.S. Marine Corps' Dragon Runner.

By 2010, more than 1500 Fido explosives detectors were fielded to American soldiers, and the U.S. Congress provided $7 million in funding to Nomadics to manufacture more Fido explosives detectors for American military operations. In 2011, FLIR Systems (formerly Nomadics) commercially released an upgrade to the Fido XT explosives detector called Fido NXT, which featured a new design for the device to be more durable and modular.

== Tests ==
=== Fort Leonard Wood ===
Blind field tests for the Fido explosives detector first took place at a DARPA facility at Ft. Leonard Wood, MO in order to evaluate the performance of the device compared to that of trained canines. During the trial, landmines were planted in the test field with two flags approximately 50 cm apart indicating the location of each test position. The landmines were authentic TMA5 or PMA1A landmines with the fuzes and detonators removed along with shipping plugs capping the detonator. Three different teams were tasked with detecting the buried landmines at each test position. One featured the use of the Fido explosives detector and the other two were experienced teams of canines, one trained to detect explosives (i.e. bombs) and the other trained to detect landmines.

According to the results of the field tests, the canine team trained to detect landmines performed better than the canine team trained to detect explosives. The latter eventually withdrew from the field tests due to the immense difficulty in completing the task. However, even the canine team with real-world experience finding landmines faced difficulty performing the task due to very hot and dry weather conditions on the field. In contrast, the team using the Fido explosives detector generally performed better than the experienced canine landmine detection team. In terms of detecting the plastic-cased TMA5 landmines, the best sensor performance demonstrated a detection probability of 89 percent with a 27 percent probability of false alarm. At the conclusion of the field tests, DARPA verified that the performance of the Fido explosives detector was at a level equal to or better than that of the trained canines, marking the first time that an electronic "sniffer" device demonstrated a landmine detection ability comparable to that of trained canines under field conditions.

=== Rakovo Polje ===
In 2001, researchers sponsored by the Army Communications Electronics Command, Night Vision and Electronic Sensors Directorate conducted a blind field test comparing the performance of the Fido explosives detector with that of the MECHEM Explosives and Drug Detection System (MEDDS), which also discerned whether or not an area contains traces of explosive vapor. Testing took place at the Rakovo Polje Test Site in Croatia from July 2001 to August 2003. The purpose of the field tests was to determine whether the MEDDS technology could be improved with the incorporation of the Fido explosives detector. The test field on which the experiment took place featured 8 to 15 individual landmines (PROM-1, TMA-1A, PMA-2, and PMA-3) randomly distributed at 10, 15, or 20 cm beneath the surface. A separate test field was established adjacent to the primary test field to determine how far trace levels of contamination could be detected from a mine. Multiple sampling trials of the field test took place throughout the duration of the experiment.

The results of the study demonstrated that both the Fido explosives detector and the MEDDS were both able to detect explosive vapor at the test site even as the months passed and field conditions changed drastically. However, there were no discernable patterns or any correlation between the sampling results of the two detector systems. The study also found that the traces of explosive-related compounds (ERCs) are largely transported through the movement of water in the soil rather than by molecular diffusion. In regards to the Fido explosive detector's performance, the system found 59 positives of 108 samples (55 percent) with the majority of the positives located deeper in the soil during the May 2003 proximity sampling. In comparison, the MEDDS found 71 percent of the samples using its own tubes and 83 percent of the samples using the Fido tubes.

=== Yuma Proving Ground ===
In 2001, researchers from Nomadics conducted field tests at Yuma Proving Ground, Arizona to test the Fido explosive detector sensors' ability to perform soil particle and vapor-only sampling. The testing site at Yuma Proving Ground was situated in a harsh desert environment with extremely dry soil, which reduced the transport of ERCs through soil water movement. The test field was organized into five lanes, each of which were divided into 100 cells marked with very light rope. The Fido explosives detector was used to analyze samples taken from each cell in each lane in order to determine the location of the buried mines under very low concentration calibration standards. However, while the detector was successful in detecting the mine signatures, it was unable to precisely pinpoint the exact location of the mines in the lanes with any degree of certainty. The researchers concluded that the device's performance was due to high density of mines in the lanes which caused the chemical signatures from the mines to overlap each other, making it difficult to pinpoint the mines' exact location. However, the Fido explosives detector produced fewer sensor responses in areas away from the mine locations while sensor responses within the mine lanes were frequent despite the fact that the mine signatures can travel significantly far from the center of a mine. The researchers also found that the intensity of the sensor responses increased after a night of light rain. The study concluded that while the Fido explosives detector may have difficulty with identifying the exact location of buried landmines, it may be useful in detecting the presence of mine clusters.

== Specifications ==
Fido XT Explosives Detector Specifications
Size	9.8" x 4.8" x 2"
Weight	700 g including battery
Battery	Lithium-ion
Battery Life	4 hours
Power Supply	100 - 250V, 50 - 60 Hz
Memory	256 MB
Detectable Explosive Substances	Nitroaromatic compounds
Sensitivity	1 femtogram (1 x 10^-15 g) for TNT
Analysis Time	5 seconds
Presentation of Results	Bar chart display; audio signal; connection to external computer
Safety Issues	Moderately hot tip (90 degrees Celsius)

== Performance ==
The Fido explosives detector can collect samples using one of three methods. The most common method is direct, real-time sampling of the vapor traces using the Fido sensor, which tends to provide the most position-sensitive data and allows for greater detection of signature "hot spots." This approach focuses on collecting samples in the immediate vicinity of the sensor inlet and thus features a low volumetric sampling rate. Due to how the concentration of ERCs in the vapor signature is five to six orders of magnitude less than that of the contaminated soil producing the vapor signature, the success of this method relies heavily on the condition of the minefield at the time of the sampling. Favorable conditions include warm temperatures, light winds, damp soil conditions, and any other factors that help increase the vapor concentration or disperse the vapor signature. The best recorded performance of the Fido explosives detector using this method occurred during the DARPA field test at Ft. Leonard Wood, where the device achieved a 100 percent probability of detection with a 10 percent false alarm rate.

Another possible sampling method is the use of an electrostatic soil particle collector (ESPC), which utilizes two electrodes and an air jet to dislodge soil particles from the ground. The electrostatically charged soil samples that stick to the outer electrode are then dislodged into a sampling vial and extracted into acetone before presented to the Fido explosives detector using a portable gas chromatograph. This approach allows users to collect soil samples from a much larger area compared to the direct sampling method. For the third sampling method, both soil particles and vapor samples are collected drawing in large volumes of air through a bed of adsorbent material designed to trap ERCs. Once the sample is collected, the trapped analytes are extracted into solvent and presented to the Fido explosives detector using a portable gas chromatograph. This approach tends to allow for rapid sample collection from large areas.

Despite the convenience of the Fido explosives detector, trained sniffer dogs remain the best available detection system for explosives. Researchers have noted that the device still faces issues with a relatively low detection rate (89 percent) and a relatively high false alarm rate (27 percent). However, data collected from various field tests support the conclusion that the Fido explosives detector possesses TNT detection capabilities at least comparable to that of a trained sniffer dog. In addition, advocates for the device have argued that the Fido system allows for explosives detection in situations better suited for machines than with a dog and a handler, such as in extreme environments with harsh weather conditions. The device can also detect several different types of explosives than just TNT and may be more consistent than a trained dog, which may be expensive to train and whose performance may be affected by a variety of unknown and uncontrollable factors. However, the Fido explosives detector is also inhibited by ambient temperature, such that the nominal operating temperature for the system is 32 degrees Celsius.

== Applications ==
By the mid-2000s, the Fido explosives detector was deployed in both Afghanistan and Iraq as either a portable handheld device or an attachment to a robotic platform. The Fido explosives detector also saw use as a tool for vehicle inspection in an effort to combat vehicle-borne improvised explosive devices (VBIEDs) used by insurgents in Iraq. In 2017, the U.S. Office of the Defense Representative - Pakistan (ODRP) provided more than 50 Fido devices to the Pakistan Army as part of a $128 million counter-IED terrorism initiative. Outside of the military domain, the Fido explosives detector was incorporated as a tool for airport and building security and even saw use by the National Park Police during the July 4 celebration in 2006 at the Washington D.C. Mall. In 2009, a version of the Fido system for airport security was launched and soon became commonly used by the Transportation Security Administration in at least 70 airports nationwide.

== Awards ==
The Fido explosives detector has been recognized by multiple awards since its inception in the early 2000s. The handheld version of the system was named one of the top ten greatest inventions by the U.S. Army in 2005, and the Packbot robotic platform with the integrated Fido explosives detector received the same award in 2006. In 2007, Timothy Swager won the $500,000 Lemelson-MIT Prize for his work on amplifying fluorescent polymers. He later won the American Chemical Society Award for Creative Invention in 2013.
