= Denning Mobile Robot Company =

US robotics company

The Denning Mobile Robot Company of Boston was the first company to offer ready-made autonomous robots that were subsequently purchased primarily by researchers. Grinnell More's Real World Interface, Inc. (RWI) and James Slater's Nomadic Technologies (US), along with Francesco Mondada's K-Team (Switzerland), were other pioneering companies in this field, addressing the need for ready-made robots for use by robotics researchers. RWI created the B-21, Nomadic the XR4000, whilst the tiny Khepera mobile robot emerged from the stables of the Swiss K-Team. However, the high price of these machines meant that only a few graduate students and military researchers could afford them. Eventually, the low-cost Pioneer robot was introduced in 1995 (from a collaboration between RWI and ActivMedia Robotics), a project that expanded research in mobile robotics due to the affordable price.

== History ==
By 1999, the Denning company was defunct. In 1998, RWI joined with ISRobotics to form iRobot. More introduced the PackBot remote control robot, veering away from autonomous research robots to pursue military markets. Nomadic Technologies also left the field. MobileRobots Inc and K-Team continued to supply the research community.

In 2003 the Defense Advanced Research Projects Agency (DARPA) contracted with Segway to convert fifteen Segway PTs into Segway Robotic Mobility Platforms. Segway and delivered units to DARPA in April. In June DARPA worked with SPAWAR Systems Center San Diego to distribute the units to 14 government and university research institutions.

== Autonomous navigation techniques ==
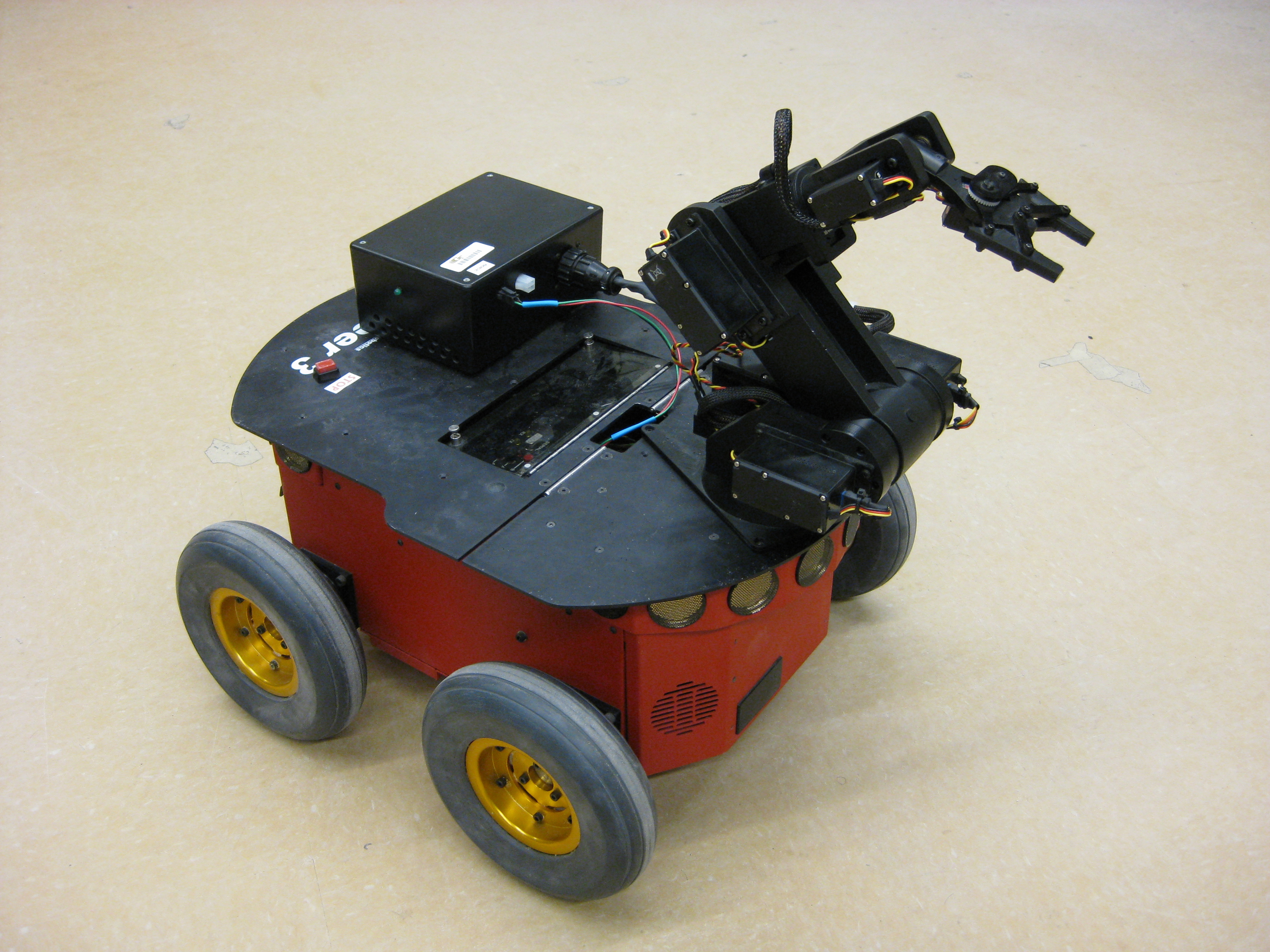
An ActivMedia Pioneer 3-AT robot at the Georgia Institute of Technology

=== Indoor operation ===
Research robots improved in autonomous indoor operation during the 1990s and the 2000s. Ready-made research bases offer the necessary sensing, mobility and computational power. These include the Pioneer, PatrolBot, PowerBot, and PeopleBot. These platforms can map buildings and navigate out-of-the-box, using SLAM and a variation on Monte Carlo method/Markov localization and modified value-iterated search, with any sensor of the 2-D range-finder class. This method creates a human readable map of the robot's workspace that can control and track robots as they move. Evolution Robotics offers single-camera VSLAM software, which replaces range-finding with visual pattern-matching, but this system cannot create a human-readable map. Other groups are building stereocam-based VSLAM. Because the stereo camera provides range-finding data, maps can be made and robots tracked. The K-Team Khepera, Segway-based platforms and other research robots can link to external computing resources to use such software.

Precision depends upon sensor precision, data granularity and calculation speed. Range-finding lasers may have +/-1 cm accuracy while digital stereo camera accuracy is limited to .25 pixel and thus is range-dependent. Vision-based systems require more computational resources than simple range-finding systems such as lasers, but may employ a digital signal processor embedded with the camera. Cost/precision trade-offs led to less expensive vision-based systems on consumer robots while commercial and industrial robots and automated guided vehicles (AGVs) tend to use laser-based systems.

=== Outdoor operation ===
Outdoors, localization is primarily handled with GPS, however, satellite signals can frequently be lost due to obstructions. Without a robots typically use dead reckoning and inertial motion tracking. Dead reckoning relies on relative wheel motion and is subject to cumulative slippage errors. Inertial motion tracking uses rate gyroscopes and accelerometers to measure motion. Accuracy depends upon sensor quality and calibration. The Segway RMP 400 and Seekur robots are two of the platforms designed for such research; most other outdoor research robots are jerry-rigged from existing vehicles.

In constrained outdoor areas, some robots, such as the John Deere Gator, simply surround the perimeter with radio beacons and use simple triangulation from three or more beacons to localize and navigate. Beacons are also used indoors by older AGVs in factories.

== Programming ==
Much research software for autonomous robots is Free Software or Open Source Software, including: Robot Operating System, Carmen from Carnegie Mellon, Player/Stage/Gazebo from the University of Southern California and the ARIA APIs from MobileRobots Inc. URBI with a Free Software SDK, is used in many universities.

Commercial software includes Webots, which has been developed since 1998 and is licensed by more than 500 universities. It runs on Linux, Windows and Mac OS X. In June 2006, Microsoft Research began offering free beta-test copies of a Robotics Studio software development kit with Pioneer robots in simulation for Windows XP.
