= Helen Greiner =

American computer scientist, engineer

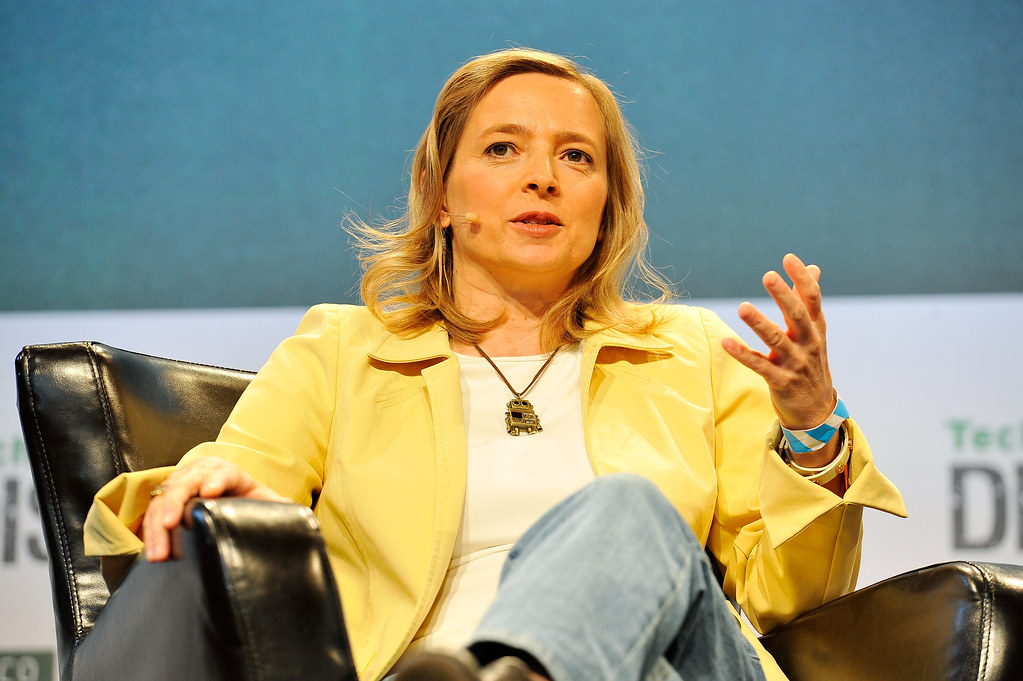
- Greiner in 2015
- Born: December 6, 1967 (age 58); London, United Kingdom
- Occupations: Engineer, roboticist, and technology entrepreneur
- Known for: Co-founding iRobot; founding CyPhy Works
- Engineering career
- Employers: iRobot, CyPhyWorks, Robotic, AI & Autonomy Expert of US Army, Tertill
- Awards: Anita Borg Institute Women of Vision Award

Helen Greiner (born December 6, 1967) is an American engineer roboticist, and technology entrepreneur. She co-founded iRobot, most well known for its Roomba vacuuming robot, and was chief executive of CyPhy Works, a company specializing in small multirotor aircraft. She later became an adviser on robotics and artificial intelligence to the United States Army and was appointed chief executive and chair of the robotic-gardening company Tertill.

Greiner was elected a member of the National Academy of Engineering in 2013 for leadership in the design, development, and application of practical robots.

== Early life and education ==
Greiner was born in London on December 6, 1967. Her father came to England as a refugee from Hungary, and met his wife, Helen's mother, while he was attending Imperial College London. When Helen was five, her family moved to NYC and later Southampton, New York, US. Her father was a businessman and her mother was a nursery-school teacher. As a child, Greiner was interested in mathematics, science, and chess.

At the age of ten, Greiner went to see the popular film Star Wars. She has said she was inspired to work with robots by R2-D2 in the film.

Greiner graduated from the Massachusetts Institute of Technology with a Bachelor's degree in mechanical engineering, and earned her Master's in computer science in 1990. She studied at MIT's Artificial Intelligence Laboratory and, while a student, worked on satellite projects at NASA's Jet Propulsion Laboratory.

She also holds an honorary doctor of engineering degree from Worcester Polytechnic Institute (WPI) in 2009. Greiner has also received an honorary degree in 2017 from Clarkson University. Her long term goal is to understand the nature of intelligence.

== Career ==
=== iRobot ===
In 1990, along with Rodney Brooks and Colin Angle, Greiner co-founded iRobot, a robotics company headquartered in Bedford, Massachusetts, an artificial-intelligence and robotics platform business and undertook work involving space exploration, mine detection, bomb disposal, and search and rescue. She co-designed the first version of the iRobot Roomba.

Greiner served as President of iRobot (NASDAQ: IRBT) until 2004 and Chairman until 2008. During her tenure, iRobot released the Roomba, the PackBot and SUGV military robots. She has been credited with establishing a culture of practical innovation that contributed to the deployment of more than 6,000 PackBots with United States forces, and with leading financing projects that raised $35 million in venture capital and culminated in a $75 million initial public offering. A 2012 published book chapter similarly credited Greiner with the military-market strategy and the financing figures, while reporting 4,000 deployed PackBots at that point.

PackBots were used for reconnaissance and bomb-disposal missions in Afghanistan and Iraq. In 2005, the Associated Press reported that they had completed thousands of missions and that 150 were then deployed. The company went public in 2005.

She has worked at NASA's Jet Propulsion Laboratory and the MIT Artificial Intelligence Laboratory.

Greiner resigned as iRobot's chair in October 2008. Worcester Polytechnic Institute reported the following year that she had left to establish Cyphy Works, a venture focused on unmanned aerial vehicles.

=== CyPhy Works ===
Greiner founded CyPhy Works in 2008. The company created the Persistent Aerial Reconnaissance and Communications platform (PARC) and the Pocket Flyer multirotor aircraft. In 2012, Wired reported on the company's tethered EASE indoor-reconnaissance aircraft and PARC observation platform. Their microfilament tethers carried power and communications, enabling longer flight times and a secure data connection. CyPhy raised over $30M under Greiner’s leadership.

She also served on the board of the Open Source Robotics Foundation (OSRF). The foundation was established to support open-source robotics software, including the Robot Operating System and Gazebo simulator. At its launch, Greiner was also president of the Robotics Technology Consortium.

She left the company in late 2017, and subsequently resigned from her position on the board of directors to support a broader mission within the US Army.

=== United States Army ===
As of 2018, she works as an advisor to the United States Army, within the Office of the Assistant Secretary of the Army for Acquisition, Logistics and Technology, (OASA(ALT)). She was sworn in on June 4, 2018 as a Highly Qualified Expert (HQE) for Robotics, Autonomous Systems & AI for the Army (ASA(ALT)). Independent reporting subsequently described her as working at that office on robotics, autonomy, and artificial intelligence.

=== Tertill ===
In September 2020, Greiner was appointed chief executive and chair of Tertill, a Boston-area robotics company developing a solar-powered garden robot that cuts weeds. The product originated at Franklin Robotics and had been launched through a 2017 Kickstarter campaign.

== Awards and recognition ==
Greiner was listed as one of the Global Leader of Tomorrow by the World Economic Forum in 2000.

In 2003, Greiner and iRobot co-founder Colin Angle were named Ernst and Young New England Entrepreneurs of the Year. That same year, Greiner was named one of the “Top Ten Innovators” by Fortune Magazine. She was recognized by MIT Technology Review as an "Innovator for the Next Century".

In 2005, Good Housekeeping named her "Entrepreneur of the Year". and she was named by the Kennedy School at Harvard in conjunction with the U.S. News & World Report as one of "America's Best Leaders."

Greiner received the Pioneer Award from the Association for Unmanned Vehicle Systems International(AUVSI) in 2006.

In 2007, Greiner was inducted into the Women in Technology International Hall of Fame.

She received the 2008 Anita Borg Institute Women of Vision Award for Innovation for her work at iRobot. She has also been honored as one of Technology Review Magazine's TR100 "Innovators for the Next Century."

In 2013, Greiner was elected to the National Academy of Engineering. Greiner spoke at TEDxBoston in 2013, discussing how robots can save lives, performing work that is either too monotonous or dangerous for humans.

She received the DEMO God Award at the DEMO Conference in 2014. Following this achievement, she was named a Presidential Ambassador for Global Entrepreneurship (PAGE) by US President, Barack Obama and US Secretary of Commerce, Penny Pritzker.

In 2018, she was named "Woman of the Year" at Wentworth Institute of Technology.

In February 2020, Greiner was a speaker at the GoFly Prize Final Fly Off, a competition for personal flying-device designs held at NASA Ames Research Center.
