= BCT common controller =

US military technology system

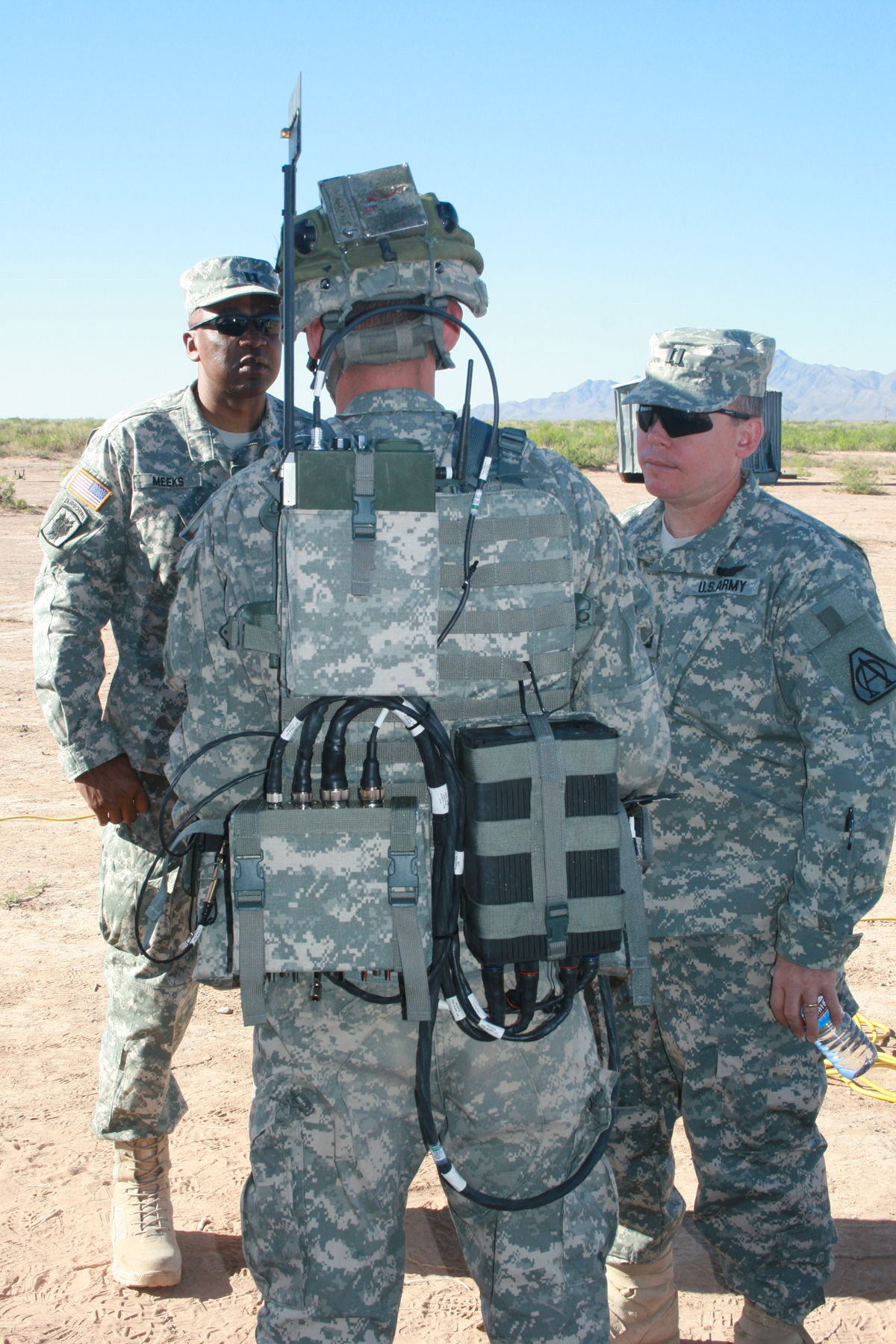
Common controller user

The BCT common controller (CC) is an integrated control system being developed for the United States Army to operate various unmanned vehicles and devices within a brigade combat team (BCT). The BCT CC aims to replace multiple separate control systems with a single handheld device, similar to a military-grade tablet computer, reducing equipment weight and complexity on the battlefield while enhancing soldiers' ability to gather intelligence, surveillance, and reconnaissance information.

The BCT CC is designed to control a range of robotic and automated systems including the class I unmanned aerial system (small reconnaissance drone), the multifunctional utility/logistics and equipment vehicle (MULE, an unmanned ground transport vehicle), the XM1216 small unmanned ground vehicle (SUGV, a portable robot for dangerous environments), and urban unattended ground sensors (U-UGS, stationary monitoring devices). Being network-enabled, the controller is intended to communicate across military networks in development phases called Spirals 2, 3, and 4, while also supporting training, maintenance, medical functions, and other soldier tasks.

As of December 2012, the US Army had not yet fielded this unified control system for its unmanned vehicles and sensors. The BCT CC remained in development, with plans to introduce it to Army units as the technology became more refined and reliable.
