= Extech Instruments =

- Company type: Subsidiary
- Industry: Electronic test equipment
- Founded: 1971; 55 years ago in Waltham, Massachusetts
- Headquarters: Nashua, New Hampshire
- Parent: FLIR Systems
- Website: flir.com/home/

Extech Instruments is a supplier of handheld electronic test equipment and measuring instruments. It is based in Nashua, New Hampshire with design, manufacturing, and warehousing facilities in Hong Kong and Taiwan and a sales office in Shanghai.

The company's products include thermal imagers, multimeters, clamp meters, air flow meters, light meters, sound level meters, tachometers, pressure sensors, calibration devices, water quality meters, moisture meters, humidity meters, contact and non-contact thermometers, power supplies, fiber optic meters, and EMF measurement devices.

== History ==
Extech was founded in 1971.

In October 2007, FLIR Systems acquired Extech for $40 million.

In December 2009, FLIR Systems sold Extech Data Systems, a division of Extech which made portable printers.

In November 2011, the company relocated to Nashua, New Hampshire.

In May 2012, the Extech HDV640W High Definition Wireless Articulating Videoscope received the 2011 Breakthrough Product of the Year award from Processing Magazine.

In July 2018, the company released the Extech UV505 Pocket UV-AB Light Meter.
