= Shenzhen Picea Robotics =

Chinese robotics technology company

Shenzhen Picea Robotics Co., Ltd.
- Trade name: Picea Robotics
- Native name: 深圳杉川机器人有限公司
- Formerly: Shenzhen 3irobotix Co., Ltd.
- Type: Private
- Industry: Robotics, Consumer electronics
- Founded: 2016; 10 years ago
- Headquarters: Shenzhen, Guangdong, China
- Area served: Worldwide
- Products: Robotic vacuum cleaners, Robot mops, Harmonic drives
- Services: Original design manufacturing (ODM)
- Number of employees: 7,000+ (2025)
- Subsidiaries: iRobot; Shenzhen PICEA Motion Technology; Santrum Hong Kong Co., Ltd.
- Website: picearobotics.com

Shenzhen Picea Robotics Co., Ltd. (Chinese: 深圳杉川机器人有限公司), trading as Picea Robotics, is a Chinese robotics technology company and manufacturer headquartered in Shenzhen, Guangdong. Specializing in the research, development, and manufacturing of consumer robots, the company is a major original design manufacturer (ODM) for several global smart home brands, including SharkNinja and Anker's Eufy.

The company was formerly known as Shenzhen 3irobotix Co., Ltd. before rebranding. In December 2025, Picea Robotics gained significant international attention after entering an agreement to acquire the American consumer robot company iRobot, the maker of the Roomba, following iRobot's filing for Chapter 11 bankruptcy.

== History ==
Picea Robotics was founded in 2016 in Shenzhen, a major hub for hardware innovation in China. The company initially established itself as a contract manufacturer and supply chain partner for major international technology firms. Over the years, it developed a reputation for manufacturing smart vacuum cleaners and robotic mops for leading brands, including iRobot, SharkNinja, and Anker's Eufy brand.

By the mid-2020s, Picea had expanded its operations significantly, holding over 1,300 intellectual property rights worldwide and reporting sales of over 20 million robotic units since its inception.

== Operations ==
The company's global headquarters are located in Shenzhen. Picea Robotics operates research and development (R&D) centers and manufacturing facilities in both China and Vietnam. As of late 2025, the company employed approximately 7,000 people globally.

=== Manufacturing and ODM ===
Picea is primarily known as an ODM, designing and manufacturing products that are rebranded and sold by other companies. Before its acquisition of iRobot, Picea was already the primary manufacturer for iRobot's entry-level and mid-range robotic vacuums.

=== Proprietary Brands ===
In addition to its ODM business, the company markets its own products under the brand 3i (derived from its former name, 3irobotix). It also owns subsidiaries such as Shenzhen PICEA Motion Technology, which develops core robotics components like precision harmonic drive reducers, sensors, and motor systems used in automation and medical equipment.

== Acquisition of iRobot ==
On December 14, 2025, iRobot Corporation, the American company famous for inventing the Roomba, filed for Chapter 11 bankruptcy protection in the United States District Court for the District of Delaware. Concurrently, iRobot announced it had entered into a restructuring support agreement to be acquired by Picea Robotics.

Prior to the filing, Picea had been iRobot's primary contract manufacturer. Following the collapse of a proposed US$1.7 billion acquisition of iRobot by Amazon in 2024 due to European Union regulatory hurdles, iRobot faced deepening financial difficulties. In November 2025, Picea's subsidiary, Santrum Hong Kong, acquired a significant portion of iRobot's debt from the private equity firm The Carlyle Group.

Under the terms of the 2025 agreement, Picea converted this debt into 100% equity ownership, effectively taking the company private and delisting it from the Nasdaq. iRobot CEO Gary Cohen stated that the acquisition would combine iRobot's brand and R&D capabilities with Picea's manufacturing expertise to secure the company's long-term future.

== See also ==
- iRobot
- Robotic vacuum cleaner
- Shenzhen
