= XM1216 small unmanned ground vehicle =

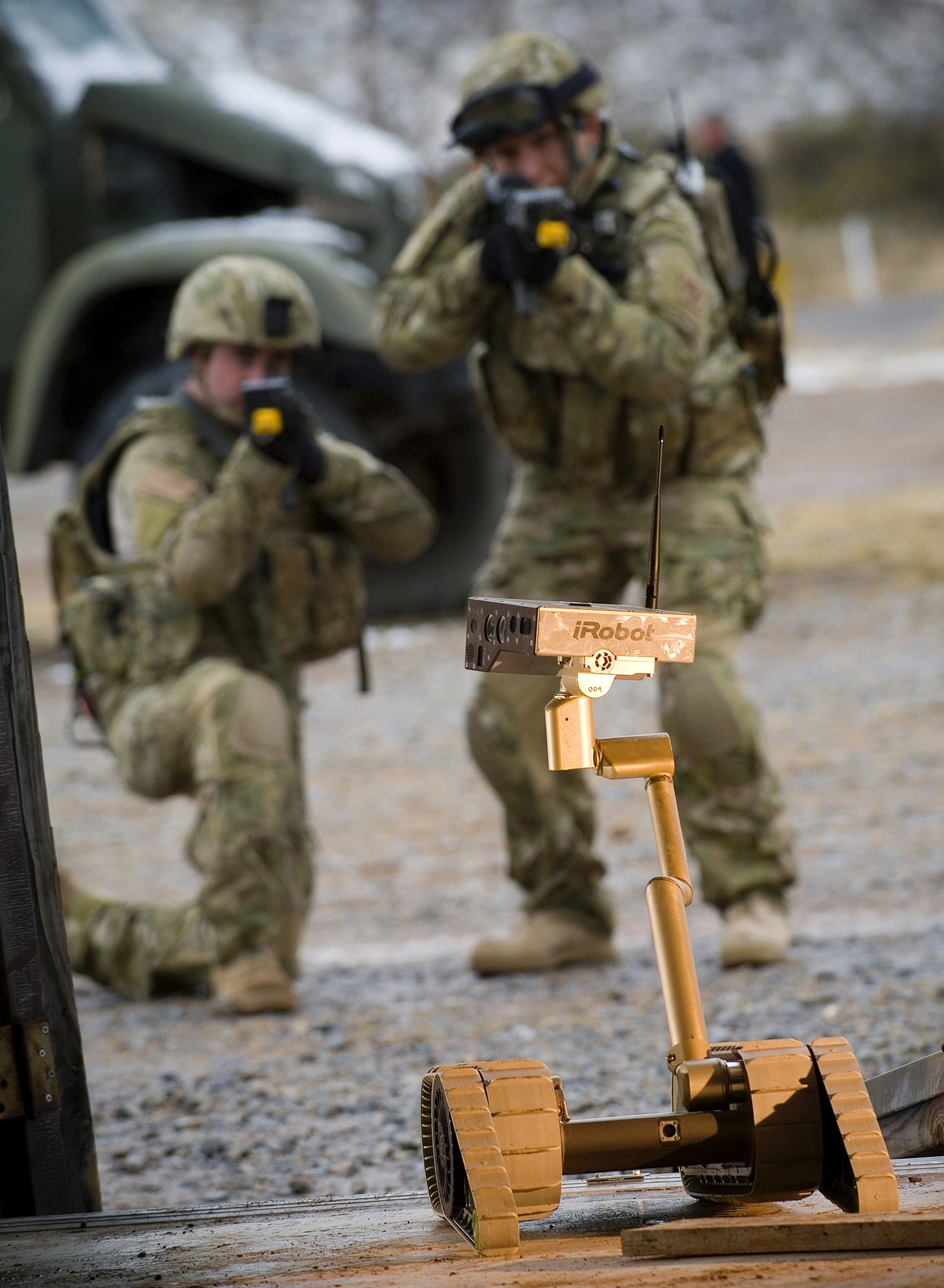
- Small unmanned ground vehicle
- Type: Unmanned Ground Vehicle
- Place of origin: United States

Specifications
- Mass: 29 pounds (13 kg)

The XM1216 small unmanned ground vehicle (SUGV) is a Future Combat Systems specific, man packable (< 30 pounds (14 kg)) version of the iRobot's PackBot. The SUGV is used in Intelligence, Surveillance, and Reconnaissance (ISR).

== Description ==
The XM1216 small unmanned ground vehicle (SUGV) is a lightweight, man portable unmanned ground vehicle (UGV) capable of conducting military operations in urban terrain, tunnels, sewers, and caves. The SUGV aids in the performance of manpower-intensive or high-risk functions (i.e. urban intelligence, surveillance, and reconnaissance (ISR) missions, chemical/toxic industrial chemicals (TIC), toxic industrial materials (TIM), reconnaissance, etc.).

Working to minimize soldiers' exposure directly to hazards, the SUGV's modular design allows multiple payloads to be integrated in a plug and play fashion. Weighing less than 29 pounds (13 kg), it is capable of carrying up to 6 pounds (2.7 kg) of payload weight.

The XM1216 can either be remotely manned, or manipulated through use of a Microsoft Xbox 360 gamepad fitted with speciality drivers. Alternatively a ruggedized controller known as Small HaWC (HArm's Way Controller), more suited to combat environments may be used in place of the Xbox 360 controller.

The SUGV is part of Spin Out 1 and has entered evaluation at the Army Evaluation Task Force (AETF). It will be fielded to IBCTs starting in 2011.

In February 2012, the Army announced their intention to issue a sole-source contract to iRobot for the XM1216 SUGV robotic system. The contract is for developing, supporting, and testing hardware and software related to the XM1216.

In August 2015, the U.S. Marine Corps ordered 75 SUGVs.

== Gallery ==
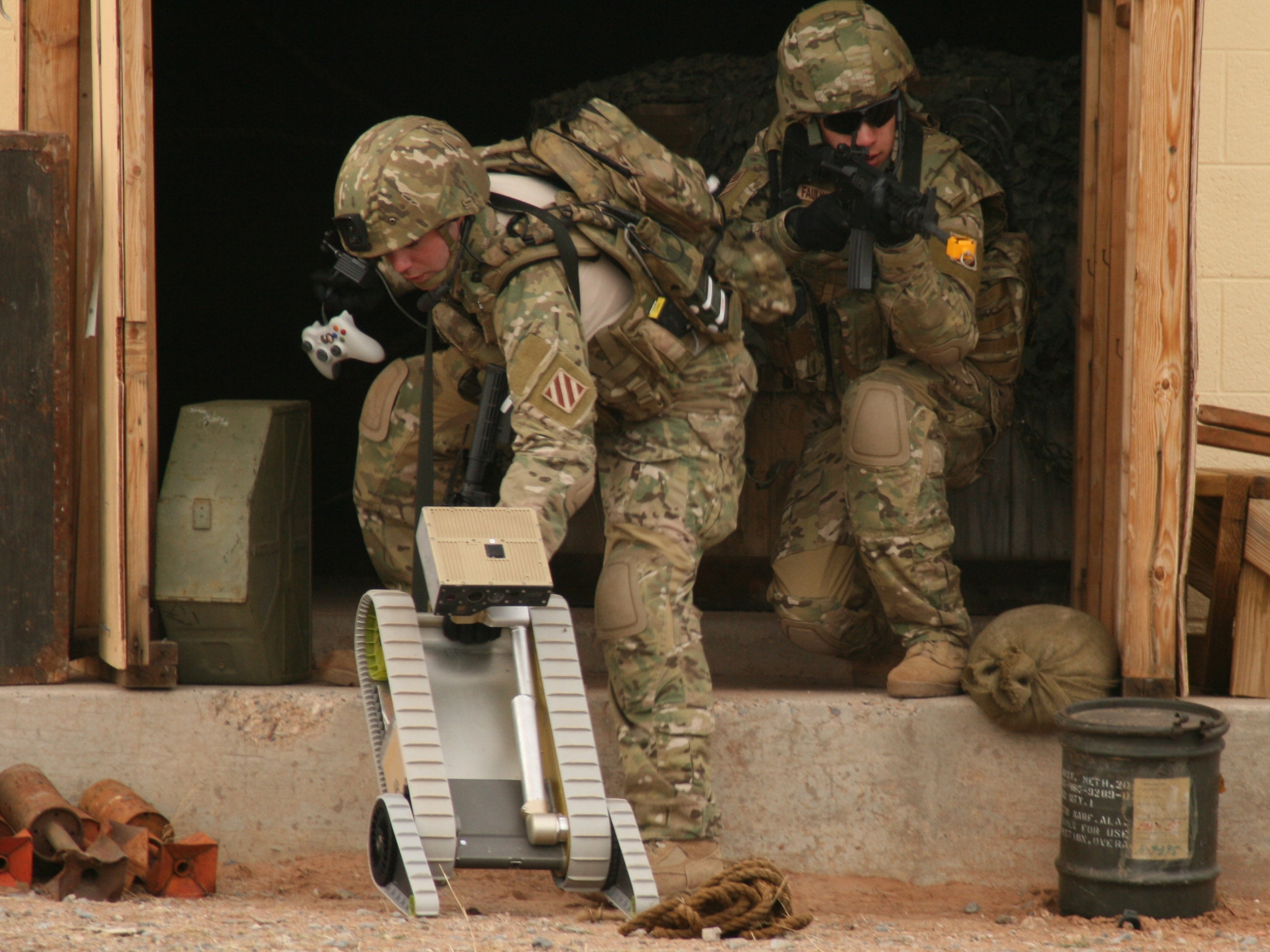
Note the Xbox 360 controller held by the operator

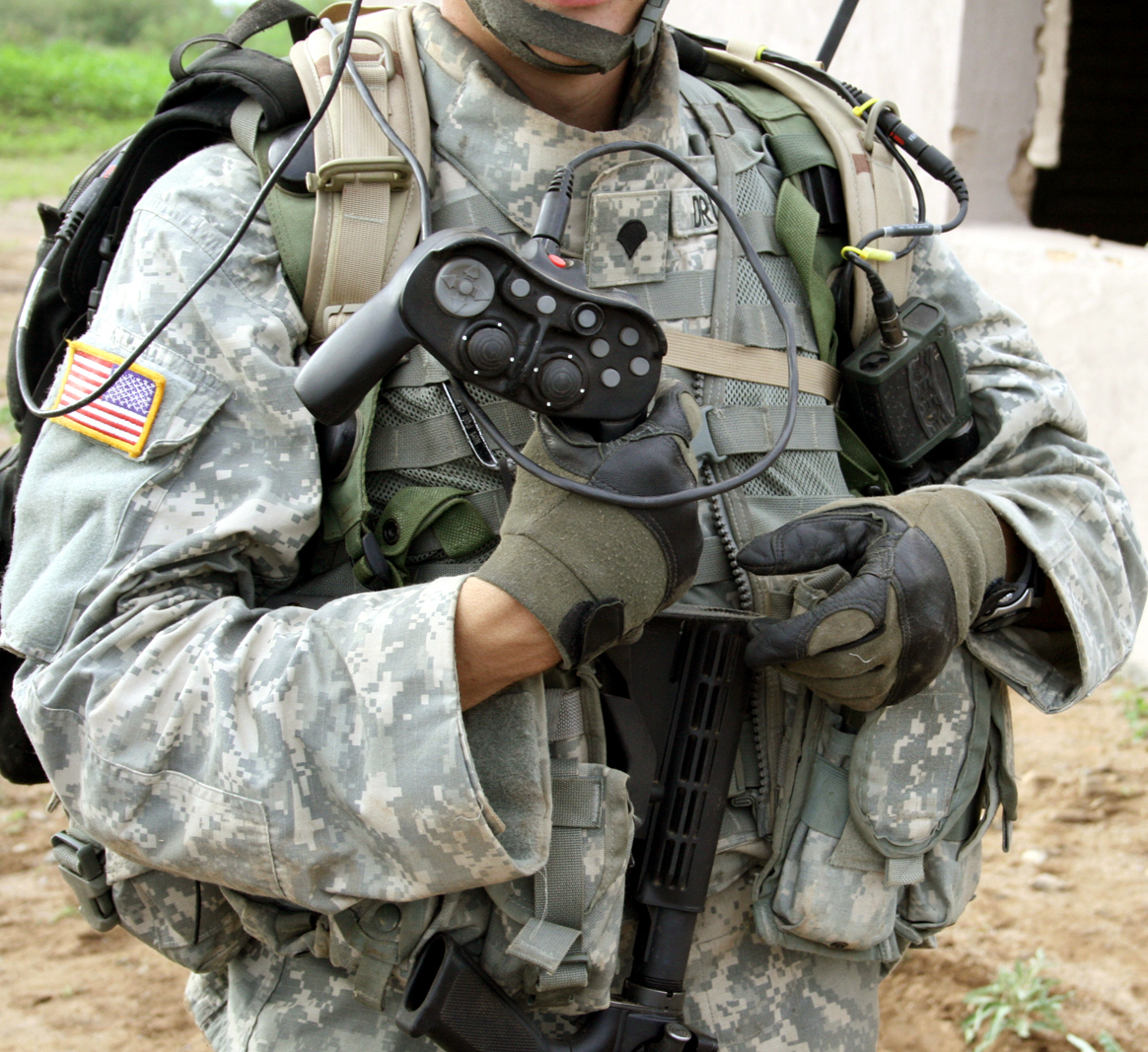
Alternative SUGV controller

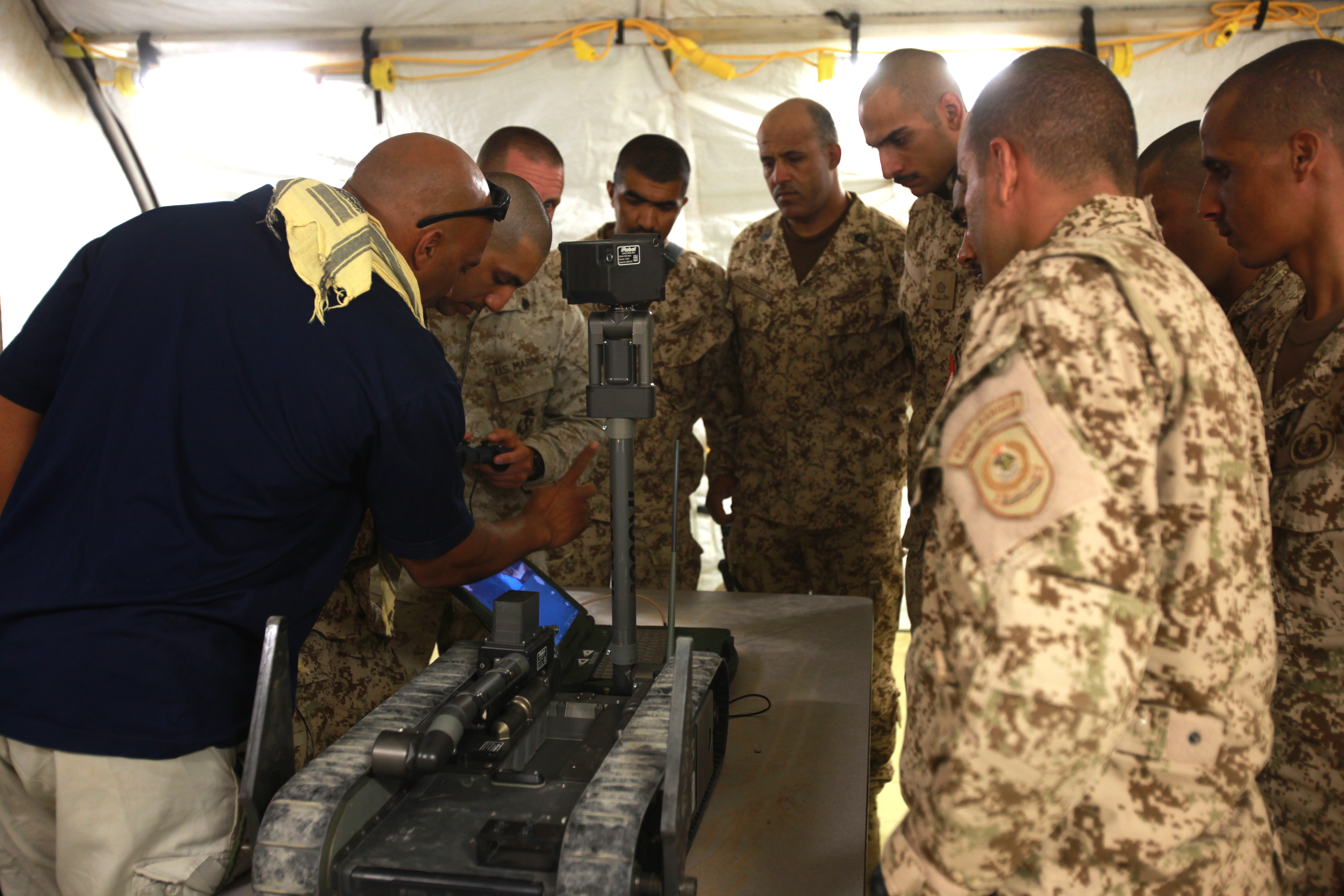
A robotics technician assigned to the Bahraini Special Security Force (BSSF) trains soldiers on the SUGV
