= Teledyne FLIR =

U.S. technology company

Teledyne FLIR LLC
- Company type: Subsidiary
- Industry: Imaging technology, defense, security, law enforcement, thermography
- Founded: 1978; 48 years ago
- Headquarters: Wilsonville, Oregon, U.S. 45.32065°N 122.7647°W; Arlington, Virginia
- Key people: Edwin Roks, EVP & CEO; Todd Booth, CFO; Robert Mehrabian, Chairman
- Products: Thermal imaging, infrared
- Revenue: ▲$1.923 billion (2020)
- Net income: ▲$212 million (2020)
- Total assets: ▲$3.252 billion (2020)
- Total equity: ▲$1.883 billion (2020)
- Number of employees: 4,179 (2020)
- Parent: Teledyne Technologies
- Website: www.flir.com

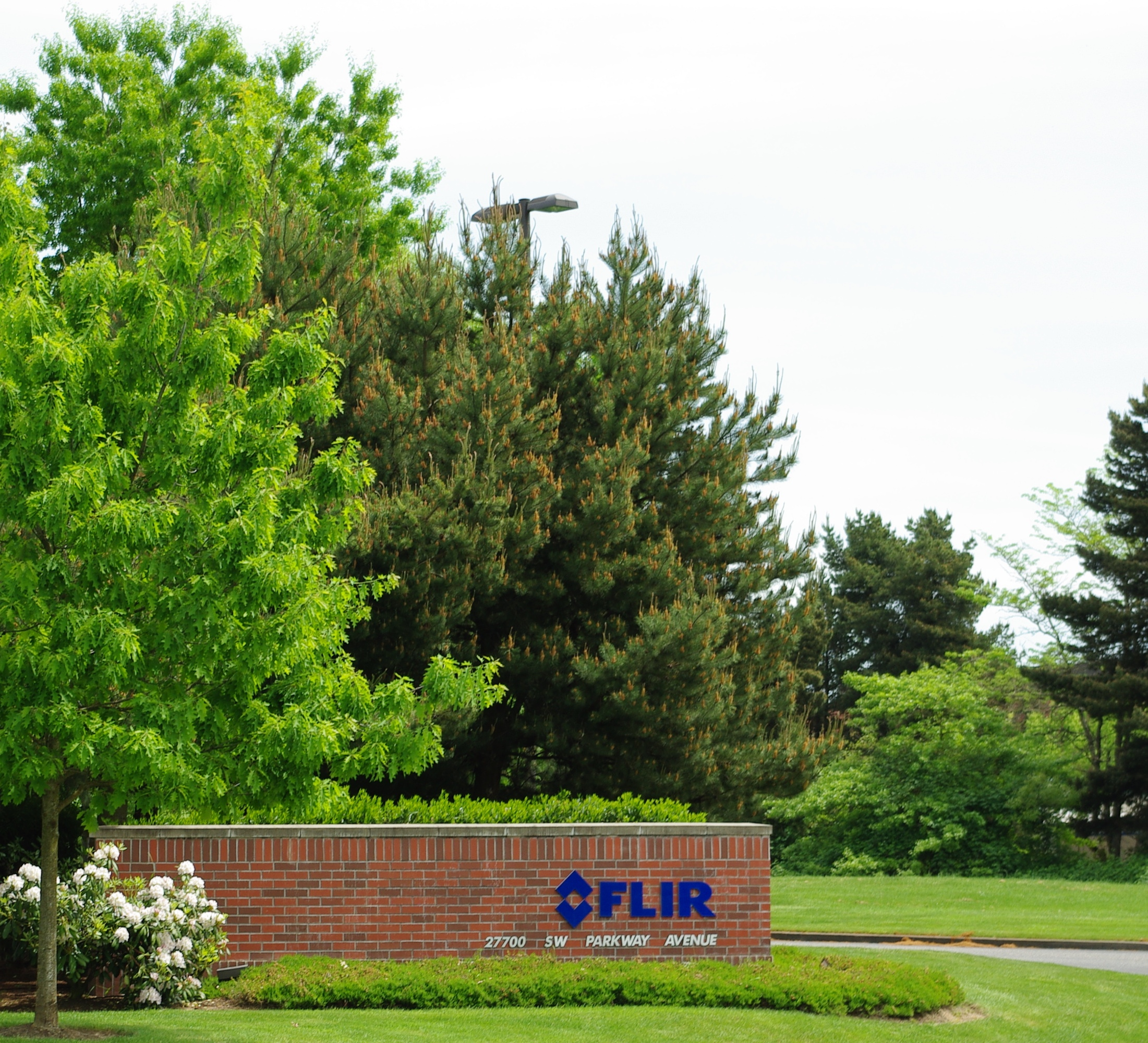
Entrance to company headquarters in Wilsonville, Oregon, which is adjacent to the Mentor Graphics campus.

Teledyne FLIR LLC, formerly FLIR Systems Inc, (an acronym for "forward-looking infrared"), a subsidiary of Teledyne Technologies since January 2021, specializes in the design and production of thermal imaging cameras and sensors. Its main customers are governments and in 2020, approximately 31% of its revenues were from the federal government of the United States and its agencies.

== History ==
The company was founded as FLIR Systems in 1978 to pioneer the development of high-performance, low-cost infrared (thermal) imaging systems for airborne uses. Originally based in Tigard, Oregon, the company relocated to Portland, Oregon, in the mid-1990s.

In 1990, the company acquired the industrial infrared imaging group of Hughes Aircraft Company. The company became a public company via an initial public offering in June 1993, raising $12 million. In January 1998, the company acquired Agema Infrared System of Sweden for approximately $80 million.

In January 1999, J. Kenneth Stringer III was named President and CEO of the company. The company acquired Inframetrics three months later. Stringer was fired by the board of directors due to errors in the company's accounting practices in 2000, and Earl Lewis replaced Stringer as President and CEO of the company. PricewaterhouseCoopers was dismissed as auditor. In January 2001, FLIR agreed to pay $6 million to settle class-action shareholder litigation and FLIR settled with the U.S. Securities and Exchange Commission in October 2002. Three executives were charged with fraudulent accounting.

In 2004, the company acquired a building in Wilsonville, Oregon, from Mentor Graphics for $10.3 million for use as a new headquarters. That year, FLIR acquired Indigo Systems, a developer and supplier of infrared imaging products, including cooled and uncooled infrared detectors, camera cores, and finished cameras, for $190 million. In 2011, after losing a trade secrets claim against the founders of Indigo Systems, FLIR agreed to pay $39 million to settle a countersuit.

Beginning in 2005, the company began supplying BMW with imaging technology for use on its vehicles. The company reported in 2007 that it would restate its financial statements for the period from 1995 to 2005 due to options backdating. FLIR had been sued by investors for options backdating, but the lawsuits were thrown out in November 2007. FLIR acquired Extech Instruments for $40 million the month prior.

FLIR acquired Ifara Tecnologias of Spain for €7.0 million in 2008. The company sold off Extech Data Systems, a division of Extech which made portable printers, December 2009; at the same time, it acquired security hardware maker Directed Perception for $20 million. FLIR acquired the bankrupt electronics manufacturer Raymarine in May 2010 for $180 million.

In December 2012, the company acquired Lorex Technology for $60 million. Lorex was sold to Dahua Technology in 2018 for $29 million. Andrew C. Teich was appointed President and CEO after the retirement of Earl Lewis in 2013. In April 2015, the company paid $9.5 million to settle allegations of violations of the Foreign Corrupt Practices Act after it paid for a world tour for Saudi Arabian officials. According to the U.S. Securities and Exchange Commission, FLIR earned more than $7 million in profits from sales influenced by the FCPA violations. The company acquired DVTEL, a provider of software and hardware technologies for advanced video surveillance, for approximately $92 million in cash the same year.

In November 2016, FLIR acquired the Canadian company Point Grey Research, owner of the Brickstream brand of camera products, for $259 million. Point Grey Research also owns the Blackfly camera line, the Dragonfly camera line, and the Grasshopper camera line. The following month, FLIR acquired Prox Dynamics, the makers of the Black Hornet Nano, a nano-drone used by the military and law enforcement for surveillance and reconnaissance, for $134 million.

In May 2017, Jim Cannon was appointed President and CEO of the company. That year, the company partnered with the WWF's Wildlife Crime Technology Project, an initiative supported by a $5 million grant from Google. FLIR cameras were deployed in several game preserves in Namibia, Kenya, South Africa, Malawi and Zimbabwe. The program's thermal cameras, along with drones, digital tracking systems and other technology, was used to prevent poaching.

Two years later, in 2019, the company acquired Aeryon Labs for $200 million. FLIR then acquired Endeavor Robotics, the former iRobot division responsible for unmanned ground vehicles (UGVs) for the global military, public safety, and critical infrastructure markets, for $382 million in cash two months later. The company also opened a second headquarters in Arlington County, Virginia. In October, the company acquired from Aria Insights patents related to tethered drones, which are connected to the ground with a cable and can stay aloft much longer than drones powered by batteries. The company, formerly known as CyPhy Works, had failed earlier in the year.

In April 2020, during the COVID-19 pandemic, the company released a thermal camera that can be used to identify elevated skin temperature. Demand for these products surged, putting stress on the company's supply chain. Teledyne Technologies announced in January of the following year that it had entered into a definitive agreement to acquire the company for $8 billion, against FLIR's 2019 revenue of $1.9 billion. The acquisition was completed in May 2021, and FLIR Systems Inc. continued as Teledyne FLIR LLC. On October 25, 2022, the company was awarded $48.7 million (USD) to provide Maritime Forward Looking Infared (MARFLIR) II sensors and variants of the SeaFLIR 280-HD surveillance systems to the United States Coast Guard.

== Products ==
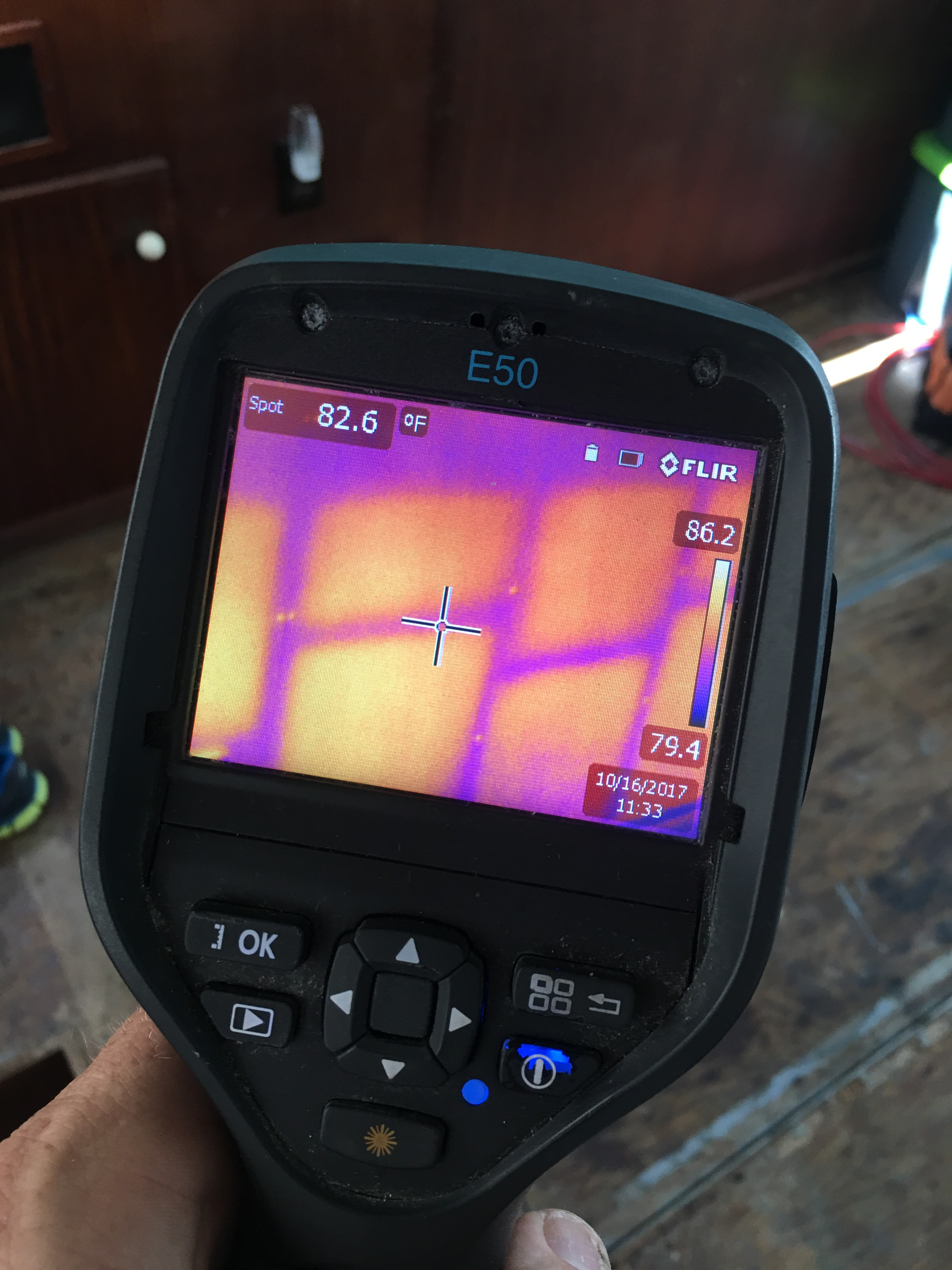
Infrared thermal imaging with a FLIR E50 camera

FLIR produces devices for the following markets:

- Surveillance and reconnaissance
- Force protection
- Border and maritime patrol
- Critical infrastructure protection
- Search and rescue
- Detection
- Targeting
- Airborne law enforcement
- Drug interdiction

=== FLIR One ===
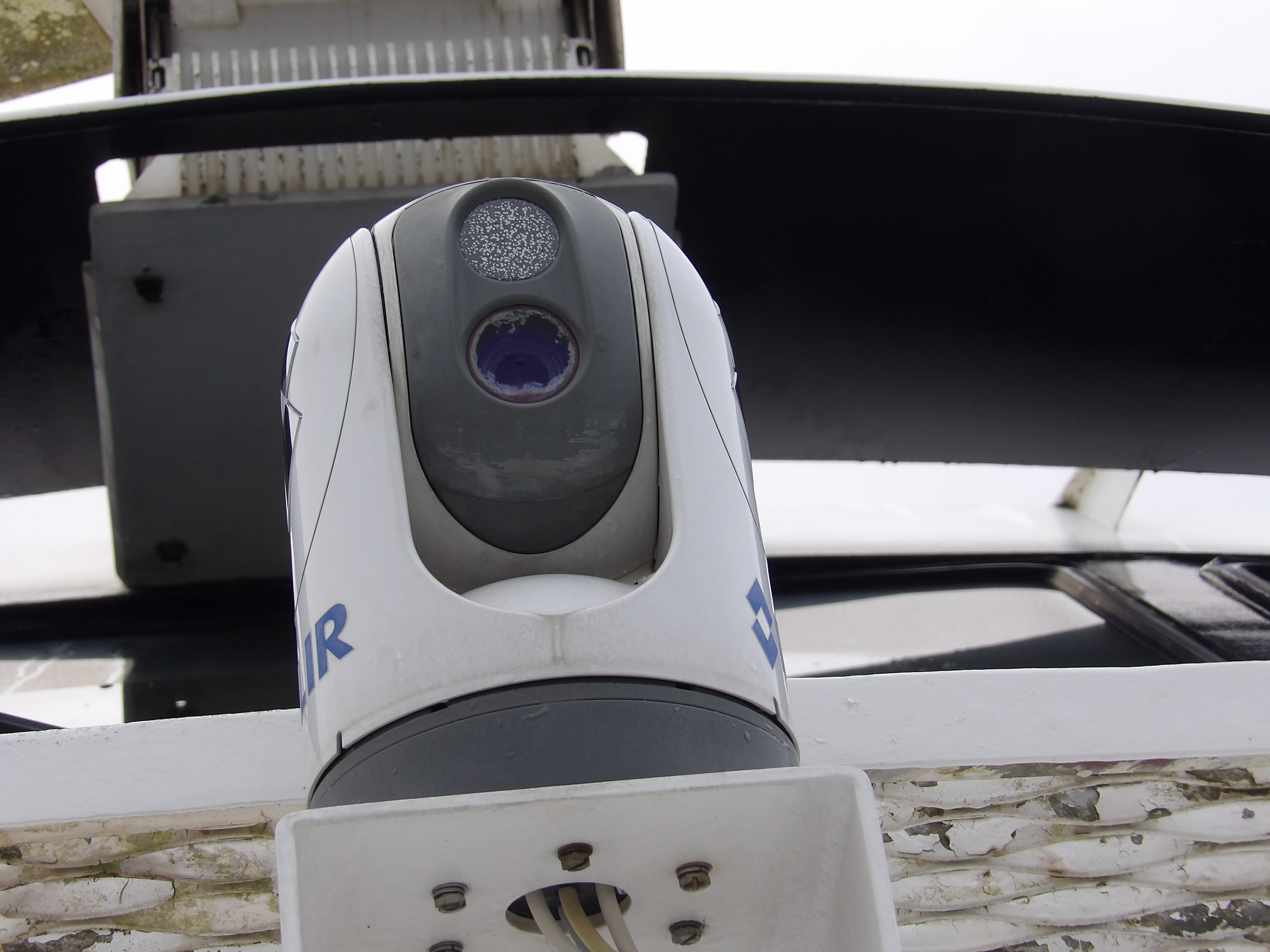
FLIR M232 marine thermal camera

The FLIR ONE camera is limited to nine frames per second due to United States regulatory concerns. The camera can be used to detect water and air leaks.

=== AN/PVS-22 ===
The AN/PVS-22, designated as the Universal Night Sight (UNS) is a clip-on night vision sight built off FLIR's MilSight 105 scope. The UNS can be used to engage long-range targets and can handle recoil up to .50BMG. The AN/PVS-22 was originally co-designed by Knight's Armament Company and OSTI Inc. for SOCOM. Ownership of the tradename "Universal Night Sight" was fought over by KAC and OSTI.

== See also ==
- List of companies based in Oregon
- List of military electronics of the United States
