= Processing Magazine =

Monthly trade magazine covering process manufacturing

Processing Magazine is a monthly trade magazine that covers process manufacturing. It serves manufacturers of food and kindred products, textiles, industrial chemicals, plastic materials, synthetic resins, petroleum, natural gas and pharmaceuticals. In June 2013, it had a circulation of 70,599 copies. It was established in 1987 by Putman Publishing Company and was acquired by Grand View Media Group in 2005. Grand View Media Group is a wholly owned subsidiary of EBSCO Industries, Inc. The magazine has its headquarters in Birmingham, Alabama.
