= TMA-5 mine =

Anti-tank mine

The TMA-5 and TMA-5A are rectangular plastic cased Yugoslavian minimum metal anti-tank blast mines. The mine's top surface has a single circular threaded fuze cap in the center, covering the fuze well. Additionally there is a small compartment for storing the fuze when disarmed. The corners of the mine have small posts to permit stacking of the mine. Although the mine does not have a secondary fuze well, it could easily be fitted with an improvised one in the field. The mine uses a single black plastic UANU-1 fuze.

The most obvious difference between the TMA-5 and the TMA-5A is that the TMA-5 uses a rope carry handle, and the TMA-5A uses a webbing carry handle.

The mine is found in Afghanistan, Albania, Angola, Bosnia, Chad, Croatia, Kosovo, Lebanon, and Namibia.

== Specifications ==
- Length: 300 mm
- Width: 275 mm
- Height: 110 mm
- Weight: 6.6 kg
- Explosive content: 5.5 kg of TNT
- Operating pressure: 100 to 300 kg
