= IRobot =

American robotics company

iRobot Corporation
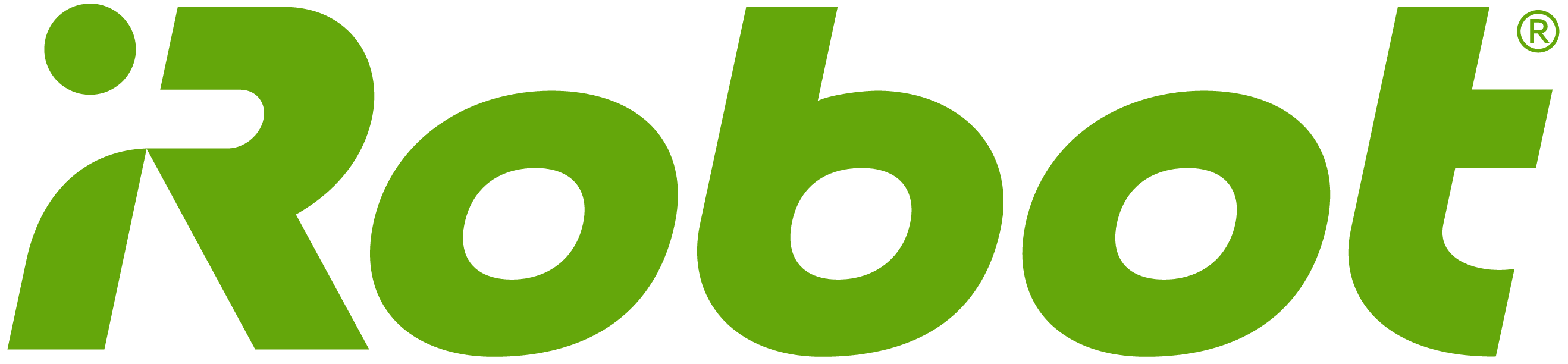
- iRobot's logo used since October 2016

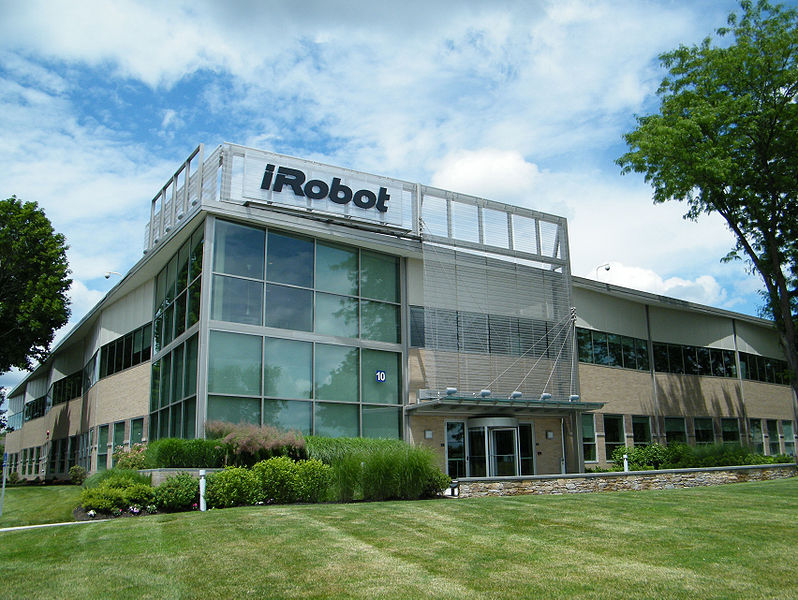
- Headquarters in Bedford, Massachusetts
- Type: Private
- Traded as: Nasdaq: IRBT (2005–2026)
- Industry: Robotics
- Founded: 1990; 36 years ago, Delaware, U.S.
- Founders: Rodney Brooks; Colin Angle; Helen Greiner
- Headquarters: Bedford, Massachusetts, U.S.
- Key people: Andrew Miller (chairman); Gary Cohen (CEO); Julie Zeiler (CFO)
- Products: Domestic robots; Military robots (until 2016)
- Revenue: ▼US$891 million (2023)
- Operating income: ▼US$−264 million (2023)
- Net income: ▼US$−305 million (2023)
- Total assets: ▼US$734 million (2023)
- Total equity: ▼US$196 million (2023)
- Number of employees: 1,113 (December 2023)
- Parent: Shenzhen Picea Robotics
- Website: irobot.com

iRobot Corporation is an American technology company that designs and builds consumer robots. It was founded in 1990 by three members of MIT's Artificial Intelligence Lab, who designed robots for space exploration and military defense. The company's products include a range of autonomous home vacuum cleaners (Roomba), floor moppers (Braava), and other autonomous cleaning devices.

A planned takeover deal by Amazon.com for US$1.7 billion, announced in August 2022, collapsed in January 2024 amid antitrust scrutiny by the European Commission. The company filed for bankruptcy in December 2025 and was acquired by Chinese manufacturer Shenzhen Picea Robotics (Picea), the company's primary designer for their new line of robots.

== History ==
iRobot was founded in 1990 by Rodney Brooks, Colin Angle, and Helen Greiner after working in MIT's Artificial Intelligence Lab. iRobot was incorporated in California in August 1990 under the name IS Robotics, Inc. and reincorporated as IS Robotics Corporation in Massachusetts in June 1994.

In 1994, under the name IS Robotics, the company participated in the Micromachine Center operated by Japan's Ministry of International Trade and Industry (MITI).

In 1998, the company received a DARPA research contract which led to the development of the PackBot.

In September 2002, iRobot unveiled its flagship home robot, the Roomba, which went on to sell a million units by 2004. In August 2005, the company won a patent infringement case against Canadian company Koolatron Corp., prohibiting them from selling an unauthorized clone of the Roomba called the Koolvac in the United States. iRobot began being traded on the NASDAQ in November 2005, under ticker symbol IRBT. On September 17, 2012, iRobot announced that it had acquired Evolution Robotics, manufacturer of automated floor mopper Mint.

In addition to deployment as bomb-disposal units with the US military in Iraq and Afghanistan, PackBots have been used to gather data in dangerous conditions at the Fukushima Daiichi nuclear disaster site, and an iRobot Seaglider detected underwater pools of oil after the Deepwater Horizon oil spill. In February 2016, iRobot announced that it would sell its military robotics business to Arlington Capital Partners, in order to focus more on the consumer market.

In November 2021, iRobot announced that it had acquired Aeris Cleantec AG, a Swiss air purifier manufacturer. iRobot began selling Aeris-designed air purifiers through its own brand in 2022. By 2020, iRobot had sold more than 30 million home robots, and deployed more than 5,000 defense & security robots.

=== Attempted acquisition by Amazon (2022–2024) ===
On August 5, 2022, Amazon announced its intent to acquire iRobot in a deal worth US$1.7 billion. The deal was subject to federal approval from the U.S. Federal Trade Commission (FTC) and other regulatory agencies. In September 2022, the FTC requested more data from both companies, amid concerns about Amazon's market power and the privacy implications of it gaining information about consumer floorplans.

In June 2023, the UK's Competition and Markets Authority cleared the acquisition, saying it wouldn't lead to competition concerns in the country. The European Commission launched a formal investigation into the proposed purchase in July 2023, citing that it would "allow Amazon to restrict competition in the market for robot vacuum cleaners ('RVCs') and to strengthen its position as online marketplace provider." In July 2023, Amazon reduced the offer price to $1.42 billion after iRobot raised $200 million in new debt to fund its daily operations.

In January 2024, Amazon and iRobot announced they would end their plans to merge in the face of opposition from EU and U.S. antitrust regulators. This resulted in Amazon paying iRobot a $94 million reverse breakup fee, iRobot laying off 31 percent of its employees, and CEO Colin Angle departing. Gary Cohen was appointed as the company's new chief executive in May 2024.

=== Bankruptcy ===
On December 14, 2025, iRobot filed for Chapter 11 bankruptcy protection after seeking court approval via a restructuring support agreement to be taken private and acquired by Shenzhen Picea Robotics, the manufacturer of Roombas, and Santrum Hong Kong, for an undisclosed amount.

== Products ==
=== Current home robots ===
==== Roomba ====
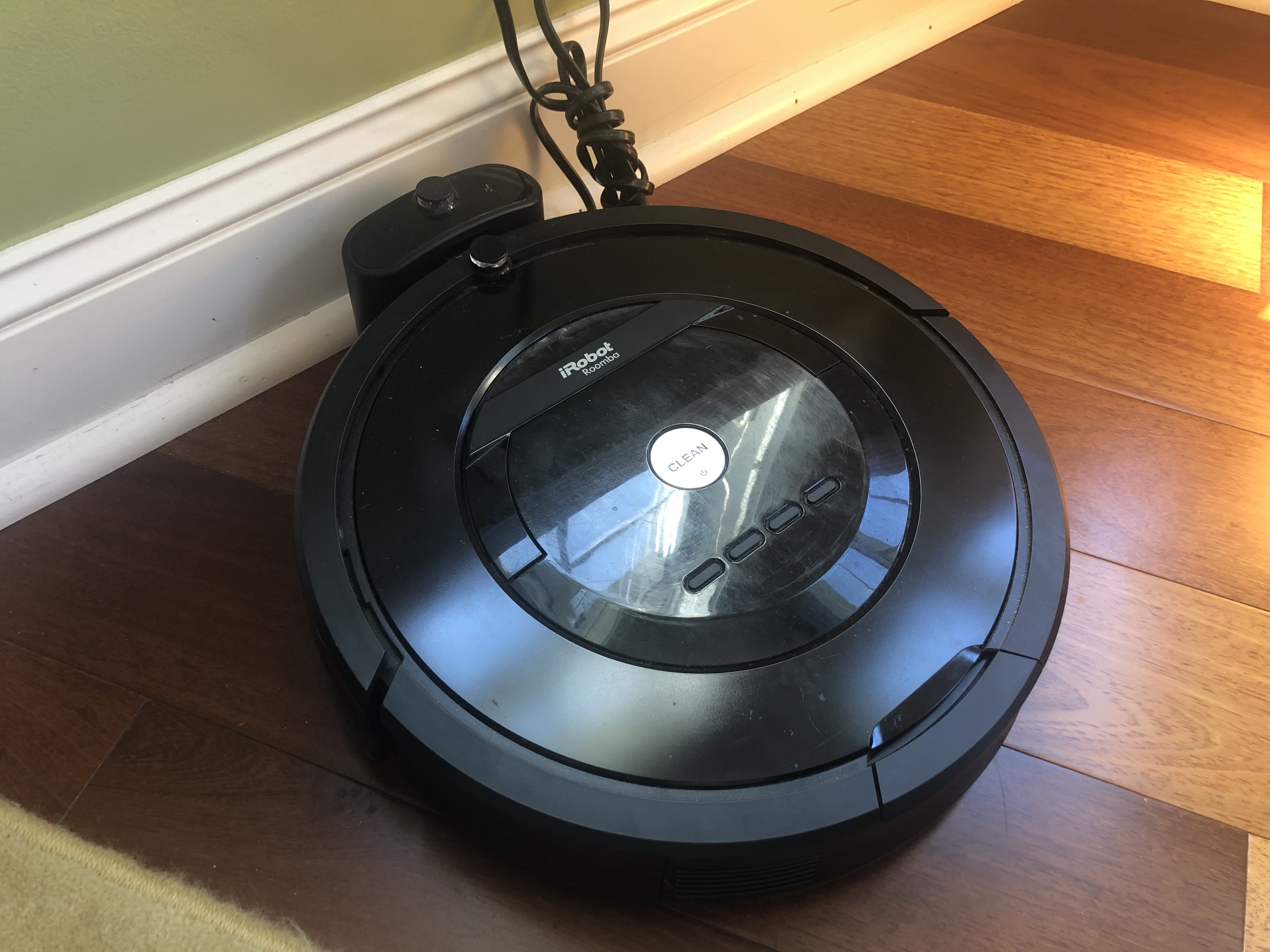
Roomba 805 on its charging dock

Roomba is an automated vacuum cleaning robot first released in 2002. Roomba is powered by a rechargeable battery, and many models are available with a docking station to which the robot returns to recharge at the end of its cleaning cycle. They work in conjunction with accessories that use both IR and RF.

The company intentionally allows customers to hack the robot because they want people to experiment and improve the product. The API for the serial has been published and the serial port made easily accessible to make modifications easy to perform.

In 2015, iRobot released an updated Roomba called the Roomba 980, with a camera that uses VSLAM technology to map out a room and the objects in the room to clean the entire floor of a home. The Roomba 980 also includes carpet boost, increasing suction when the Roomba detects itself on carpets or rugs. This was also one of the first Roombas to include Wi-Fi connectivity with app control.

In 2018, iRobot released the Roomba i7 and i7+, marking new advancements in their smart mapping with their VSLAM-enabled Smart Imprint mapping (also called iAdapt 3.0). Their robots could now save multiple floor plans, and maps made by Roomba were stored in the cloud instead of being deleted every cleaning run. The release also introduced iRobot’s Automatic Dirt Disposal system, which emptied the robot’s dust bin every cleaning run. A year later, the Roomba S9+ was released, further improving those features with higher suction power and a D shape, a first for iRobot’s Roombas.

In May 2022, iRobot announced the new operating system and software platform for its Roomba vacuum cleaners, iRobot OS. The company stated the move from iRobot genius to iRobot OS will aid in giving their products a deeper understanding of the user's households and the users habits, in addition to voice commands and greater objected identification.

In October 2022, iRobot released the Roomba Combo, which includes mopping capabilities. The robot is able to differentiate between hardwood floor and carpet, and it lifts its mop to the top of the robot when transitioning to carpet.

==== Braava ====
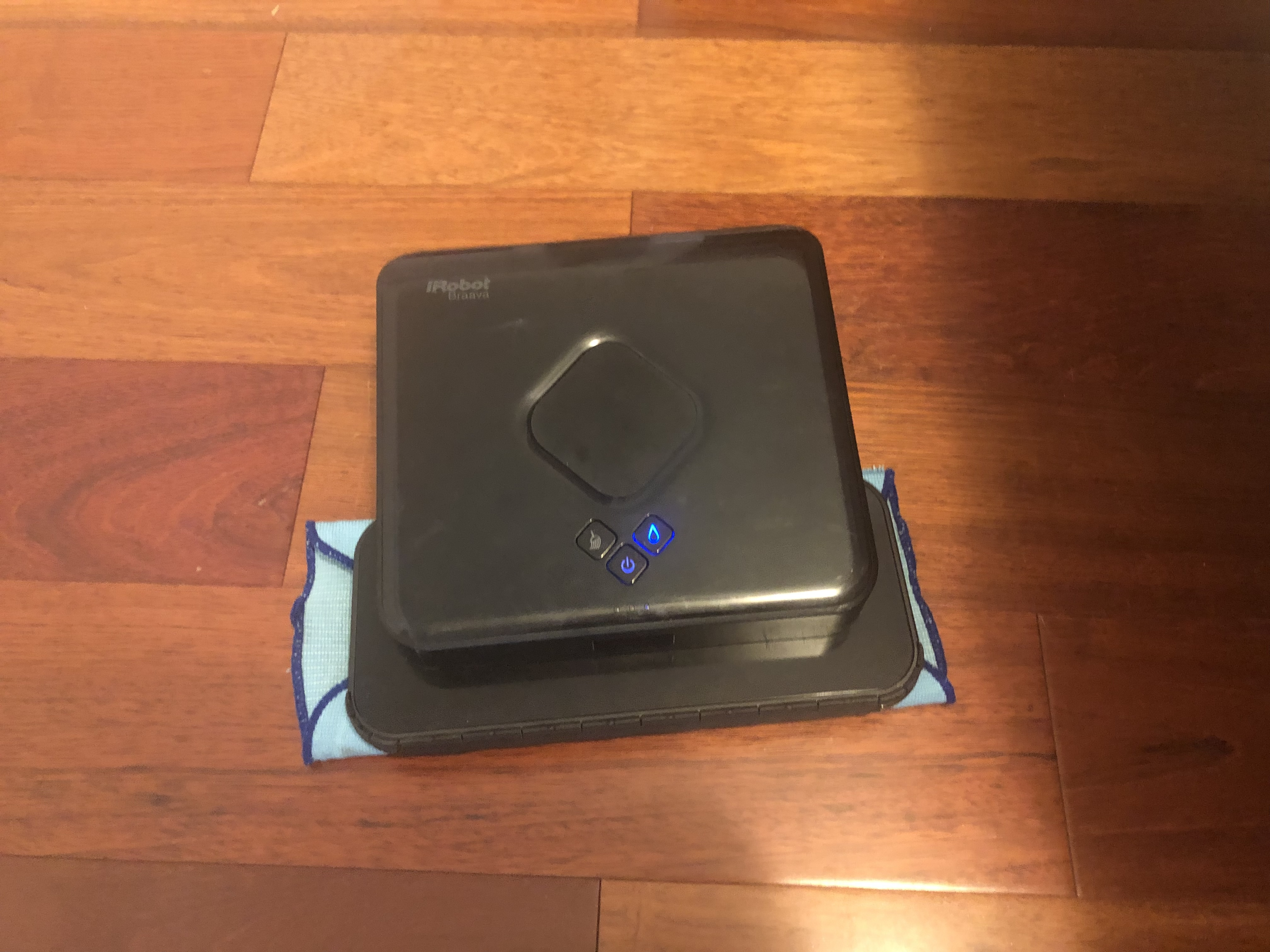
Braava 380t damp cleaning

Braava is iRobot's floor mopping robot, designed to work on hard-surface floors. Braava uses disposable or microfiber cleaning cloths for damp and/or dry cleaning. The 380t model comes with a Channel 4 NorthStar Navigation Cube, which is set on a high surface and directs the robot around the area it cleans.

The design was known as the Mint until 2013. It was developed by Evolution Robotics, which was acquired by iRobot in 2012.

==== Create ====
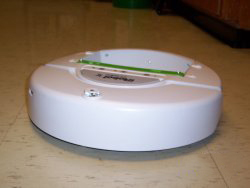
An unmodified iRobot Create with Command Module (small green attachment)

Create is a hobby robot, released in 2007. Create offers users the possibility of changing or adapting the robot's functions through experimentation with the basic elements of robotics as well as by adding sensors, grippers, wireless connections, computers, or other hardware.

==== Root ====
Root is an educational robot designed for use by children learning how to code. It is programmed through a tablet or smartphone. iRobot acquired Root Robotics in 2019. In 2024, the Root product line was acquired by SAM Labs.

=== Discontinued products ===
==== Scooba ====
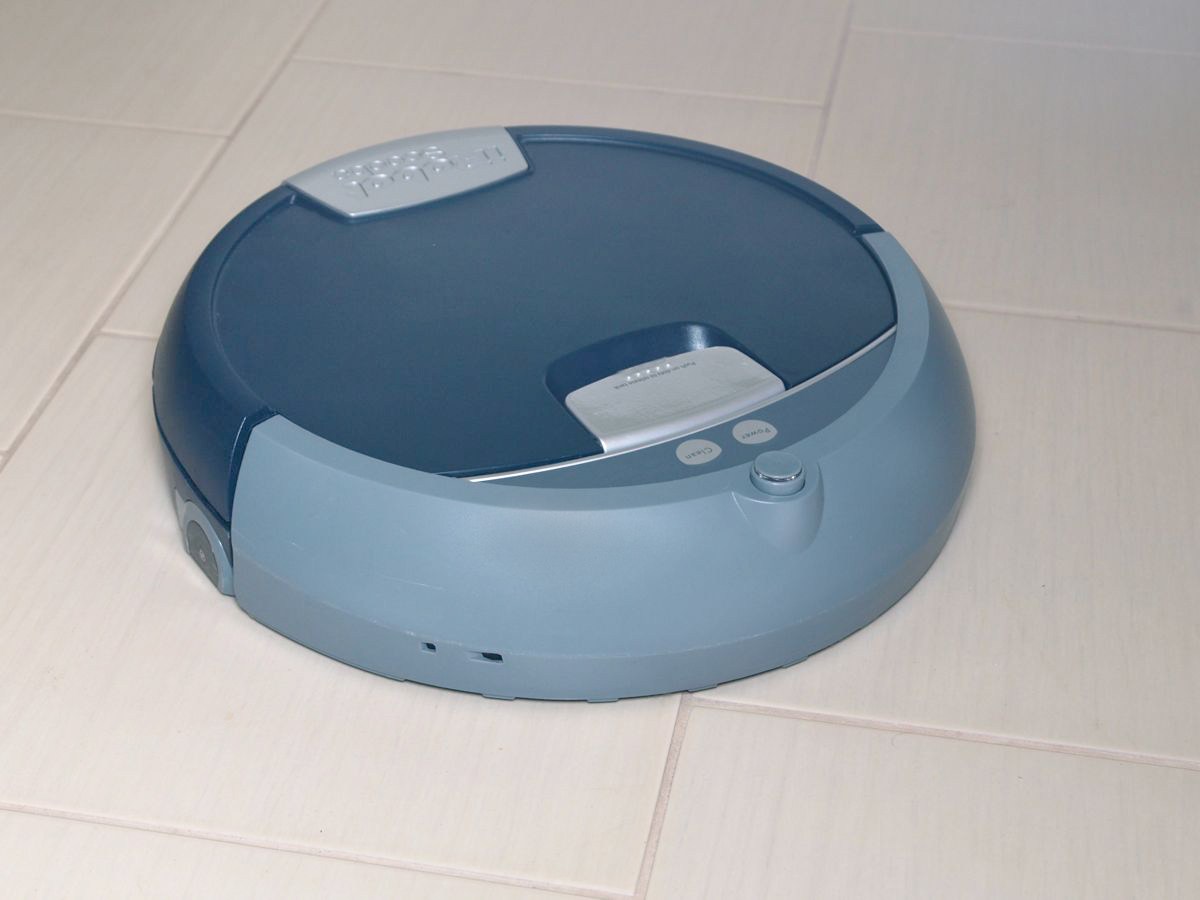
Photo of the now-discontinued iRobot Scooba 380 in 2009

Scooba was iRobot's floor-washing robot. The product became commercially available in limited quantities in late 2005 before a full product release in 2006. Early models required either a special non-bleach cleaning solution or white vinegar to wash hard floors. Newer units could use plain water. Several versions were marketed. iRobot discontinued the Scooba line of products in favor of the Braava line of floor moppers in 2016.

==== Dirt Dog ====
Dirt Dog was a variant of Roomba designed for workshop use that was released in 2006. The product picks up small objects such as nuts, bolts, dirt, and debris from a workshop or similar floor. The unit was able to be used on hard floors, shop carpets and industrial floor surfaces. The Dirt Dog was discontinued in late 2010.

==== My Real Baby ====
My Real Baby was a robotic toy marketed by iRobot from 2000 and produced in partnership with the toy manufacturer Hasbro. This product, which was meant to look like a human infant, employed animatronic facial expressions and was developed from an emotionally expressive and responsive robot developed by iRobot corporation called "IT."

==== ConnectR ====
ConnectR was a videoconferencing robot which was prototyped in 2010. It did not pass pilot tests and was not sold commercially.

==== Verro ====
Verro was a swimming-pool cleaning robot released in April 2007.

==== Looj ====
Looj was a gutter-cleaning robot released in September 2007. Looj is not an autonomous robot, but rather a remote-controlled robot patterned after a toy tank with an auger mounted on the front. The robot fits inside most gutters to clean out debris stuck inside them, such as leaves and pine needles. It has long treads on its side which allow it to move inside the gutter. The auger dislodges and removes almost all of the debris inside the gutter by flinging it sideways into the air. Looj also has a detachable handle/remote that is used to carry and operate the robot. Looj won the Best of CES Innovations Award: Home Appliances in 2008. It was discontinued in 2017.

==== Mirra ====
Mirra was a swimming-pool cleaning robot, the successor of Verro. Mirra cleaned a pool's floor and walls of large and small debris. It was discontinued in 2014.

==== Terra ====
In 2019, iRobot received FCC approval to move forward with their plans to commercialize a robotic lawn mower capable of using wireless localization technology, which they announced would be branded as "Terra". Terra uses mapping to navigate and mow the lawn in a straight-line pattern. It uses smart beacon stakes to localize itself in the yard, and is taught a boundary by the user (where the robot should avoid going, such as a garden). Terra includes Wi-Fi capabilities and a docking station for recharging. Terra was available as a beta program in 2019 in Germany and the United States. The program was indefinitely postponed in March 2020.

=== Military and policing robots ===
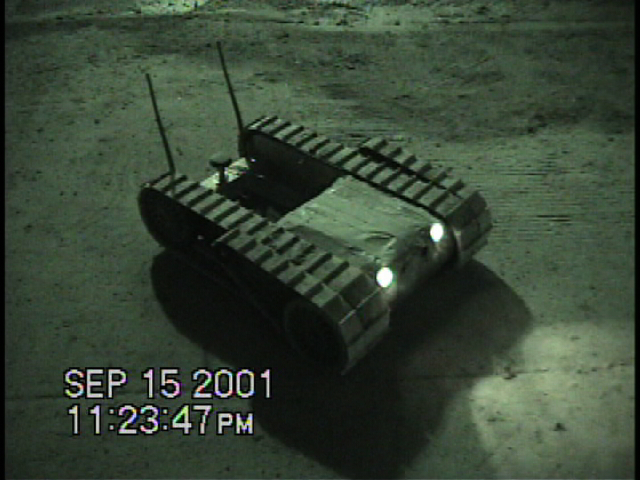
A PackBot Scout robot shown with its second pair of treads in the horizontal position. This robot is conducting search and rescue at ground zero after the 9/11 terrorist attacks.

In April 2016, iRobot sold off its Defense & Security unit, with a new company being formed called Endeavor Robotics. This unit became part of Teledyne FLIR in 2019.

==== First Generation Robots ====
- Genghis (1991) was iRobot's first robot. It was designed as a test platform for researchers. The robot is currently at the Smithsonian Air and Space Museum
- Ariel (1996) is a crab-like robot designed to remove mines, both in and out of water.
- Urbie (1997) was a proof of concept robot designed for urban environments. The platform was designed with two tank-like tracks so it could climb stairs. Urbie was field tested at Fort Benning, Georgia, United States; one model was gifted to a local high school on indefinite loan in 2005. High school students at Columbus High School in Columbus, Georgia, reconditioned the robot and created a usage manual for future students to continue to benefit from Urbie's list of talents. Urbie is built around a light, machined aluminum chassis. The exterior consists of flat aluminum plates, bent at the front and back, which are attached to the chassis with small hex screws. 2 dc motors power the forward rotating arms, while 2 slightly larger dc motors power the body length treads. From the outside, Urbie is an exact replica of the PackBot Scout. The front compartment holds 2 banks of LEDs, one white light, the other infrared. The center-front compartment holds a video camera and an infrared camera. Both cameras' images are transmitted back to a handheld LCD screen and remote control console via a single antenna. The image that is transmitted back is controlled by a mechanical switch, thrown remotely inside the chassis by a remote controlled actuator. The motors are controlled the same way that a remote control airplane or car is. The ability to reverse the tread direction on both sides gives the robot a 0m turn radius. In 2006, the exterior body was refinished, the antennas were repaired (replaced by a fishing pole) and some of the interior electronics were updated. The robot is simply constructed, with basic electronic controls, and is the same physical design as the current PackBots, it only lacks the digital processor.
- SWARM is an artificial intelligence research project designed to develop algorithms for swarms of hundreds of individual robots. This project is sponsored by DARPA.

==== PackBot ====
- PackBot is a series of military robots designed for situational awareness, reconnaissance, explosive ordnance disposal and other missions. As of 2009, the US military had more than 2000 PackBots that were on station in Iraq and Afghanistan.

==== SUGV ====
- iRobot's platform for the United States Army's Future Combat Systems.

==== Warrior ====
- Warrior, announced in 2006,), is a 250 lb (110 kg) machine that can travel up to 12 miles per hour (19 km/h) through rough terrain and up and down stairs while carrying payloads weighing over 100 pounds (45 kg). Its potential uses include bomb disposal, battlefield casualty extraction and firefighting.

==== R-Gator ====
- R-Gator, a product of a partnership with John Deere Corporation, is a small utility vehicle with a robotics package added. It is capable of autonomous operation including waypoint following with obstacle avoidance, following dismounted infantry and other vehicles and semi-autonomous operation such as teleoperation with obstacle avoidance.

==== Negotiator ====
- Negotiator is a man-portable civil-response surveillance and reconnaissance robot.

==== Transphibian ====
- Transphibian is a man-portable UUV and bottom crawler that autonomously inserts itself into the water and operates in a shallow area. It is designed for mine detection, harbor defense and surveillance. Transphibian was initially developed by Nekton Research, Inc. in Durham, North Carolina, which was acquired by iRobot in September 2008.

==== Chembot ====
- Chembot is a DARPA-funded prototype of a shape-shifting robot without motors, wheels or any rigid elements. It runs on chemical power and is made using dielectric elastomers, which are extremely flexible and can alter their shape in electric or magnetic fields. Ultimately, the program aims to build a robot that is completely squishy and able to squeeze through a hole 'the size of a 10 pence coin'.

==== Ember ====
- Ember is a prototype miniature, tracked robot, weighing around 1 lb and costing so little to make that it is intended to be virtually disposable. Ember moves at walking pace, can right itself when it is turned over and is controlled by a simple touchscreen application on an Apple iPhone. Ember is a military robot designed to boost radio communications and capture video footage to aid infantry warfighters.

==== AIRarm ====
AIRarm is an inflatable arm robot developed by iRobot. The inflatable arm uses pumps to inflate the arm. Since the arm uses strings and actuators, no motors were used at the joints.

==== FirstLook ====
FirstLook is a small reconnaissance robot weighing 5.2 lb (2.4 kg) with a top speed of 3.8 mph (6.1 km/h) and line-of-sight control range of 200 m (219 yd). It has visible and thermal cameras and infrared sensors to gather and transmit images of buildings, caves, or other locations. It can participate in explosive ordnance disposal by carrying 2.5 lb (1.1 kg) of C4 explosive to an IED. The robot has the ability to mesh together a network of feeds from other robots to extend the range of its sensors. The FirstLook has CBRN detectors and is semi-autonomous, meaning it can perform tasks like course correction and flipping itself over without direct intervention. 100 were bought by JIEDDO in March 2012 and the Pentagon has ordered hundreds more.

=== Medical robots ===
==== RP-VITA ====
- RP-VITA, or Remote Presence Virtual + Independent Telemedicine Assistant, is a medical robot jointly produced with InTouch Health. The robot will be cloud-connected and have access to a patient's medical record, and will also be able to plug in diagnostic devices such as stethoscopes, otoscopes, and ultrasound.

=== Research and dual-role robots ===
==== Ranger ====
- Ranger is a man-portable UUV that supports technology development related to mine warfare, expeditionary warfare, homeland defense, underwater surveillance and reconnaissance, and other missions. Ranger is also suitable for ocean research and commercial applications related to search and survey. Ranger was initially developed by Nekton Research, Inc. in Durham, North Carolina, which was acquired by iRobot in September 2008.

==== Seaglider ====
- Seaglider is a long-range dual-role autonomous underwater vehicle, which was produced by iRobot from 2008 to 2013 under an exclusive manufacturing agreement from the University of Washington. Capable of operating for months over thousands of kilometers on a single battery charge, networked Seagliders provide scientists and naval intelligence with cost-effective real-time access to oceanographic measurements. The Seaglider is also used in military applications where it is more usually designated as an unmanned underwater vehicle.

== Criticism ==
=== Training data on Facebook ===
Images captured by development versions of the Roomba J7, including a photo of a woman sitting on a toilet, were posted to social media in 2020. iRobot had shared approximately 2 million images with Scale AI, a company that contracts gig workers to label data for machine learning. Workers in Venezuela posted at least 15 images to private Facebook and Discord groups, violating their non-disclosure agreements. Some testers said they felt misled, as they had not expected their images to be viewed by humans or shared with overseas contractors. iRobot terminated its relationship with Scale AI following the incident.

=== Unregulated use of reserved frequency ===
iRobot has been criticized for attempting unregulated use of 6240-6740 MHz band, and asking for an FCC exemption to do so. This band is for use for the lawn mowing robot without needing to use an electronic fence as a boundary marker, instead by using radio beacons. The band falls into a band reserved for radio astronomy use, thus interfering with radio telescope observations of methanol's 6.66852 GHz emissions.

== See also ==
- Artificial Intelligence
- Autonomous research robot
- Domestic robot
- Home automation
- Neato Robotics
- Ecovacs Robotics
- Scooba
