= Space filling =

Space filling or spacefilling may refer to:

- Space-filling curve
- Space-filling model, in chemistry
- Space-filling polyhedron
- Space-filling tree
- Space-filling bubble in a foam
