= Steven M. LaValle =

American computer scientist

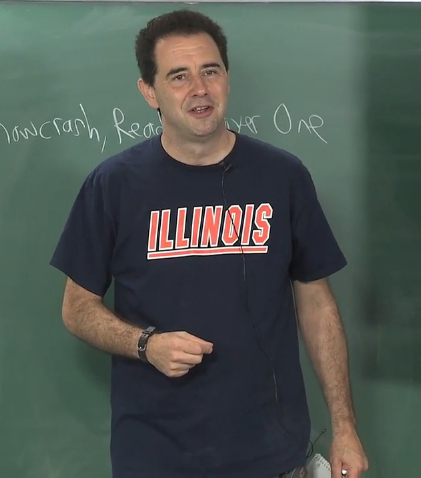
- Born: 1968 (age 57–58)
- Citizenship: United States
- Education: University of Illinois at Urbana-Champaign
- Known for: RRT, Oculus Rift
- Scientific career
- Fields: Robotics, virtual reality, AI, control theory
- Workplaces: University of Oulu, University of Illinois Urbana–Champaign, Oculus VR, Huawei, Stanford University, Iowa State University
- Doctoral advisor: Seth Hutchinson
- Website: lavalle.pl

Steven M. LaValle (born 1968 in St. Louis, Missouri) is an American computer scientist, and a professor in the Faculty of Information Technology and Electrical Engineering at the University of Oulu. He was also an early founder and head scientist of Oculus VR until it was acquired by Facebook in 2014. He is best known for his work on rapidly exploring random trees (RRTs), the Oculus Rift, and his book, Planning Algorithms, one of the most highly cited texts in the field.

== Academic career ==
LaValle received his BS, MS, and PhD degrees in Electrical and Computer Engineering at the University of Illinois Urbana–Champaign in 1990, 1993, and 1995, respectively. From 1995 to 1997, he was a post-doctoral researcher and lecturer in the Computer Science Department at Stanford University. From 1997 to 2001, he was an assistant professor in the Department of Computer Science at Iowa State University. From 2001 to 2018, he was on the faculty in the Department of Computer Science at the University of Illinois Urbana–Champaign, as a full professor. Since 2018, he has been a professor at the University of Oulu in Finland.

He has published over 150 articles, in which most of his earlier works were in the area of robot motion planning. In addition to introducing RRTs, he coined the term "sampling-based motion planning" and developed numerous planning algorithms for handling typical control-theoretic problems such as kinematic constraints, momentum, feedback, multiobjective optimality, and stochastic uncertainty.

His more recent research has focused on understanding the minimal information requirements for robot systems, leading to simpler sensor fusion methods and mathematical models that help to reduce complexity of robots (informally, their brain size) that are designed for particular tasks.

He has published three textbooks, all of which are freely available online. In addition to "Planning Algorithms", mentioned above, he wrote books titled Sensing and Filtering and Virtual Reality.

== Oculus VR ==
During a leave of absence from the University of Illinois, LaValle started working from Oulu, Finland for Oculus VR in September 2012, a few days after their Kickstarter campaign. He served as their principal scientist from March 2013 until the company was acquired by Facebook in July 2014, addressing virtual reality challenges "including sensor fusion, magnetic drift correction, and kinematic modeling" while disseminating the company's technical achievements in a science blog. He developed head tracking methods for the core software, based on IMUs and computer vision, and led a team of perceptual psychologists to provide principled approaches to virtual reality system calibration and the design of comfortable user experiences. He was a coauthor of the first Oculus SDK Overview.

He is a co-inventor on two Oculus VR patents. One (with Peter Giokaris) is for perception based predictive tracking for the Oculus Rift, which was crucial in reducing perceived tracking latency. The other is for sensor calibration and filtering methods, which were important for highly accurate, low-latency tracking.

== Other industry ==
Since 2014, LaValle has been an active angel investor and adviser to startup companies and venture capitalists, in the areas of virtual and augmented reality, and robotics.

From 2016 to 2017, he was a vice president and the Chief Scientist of VR/AR/MR at Huawei Technologies Co. Ltd.

He is also one of the International Collaborators for Experiential Technology Innovation Centre (XTIC), an IIT Madras Institute of Eminence Centre in Virtual Reality and related fields, at IIT-Madras, and awarded XTIC Award 2024 for Innovation to A.R. Rahman for his visionary work on the groundbreaking VR film, Le Musk, at IIT-Madras on 17 November 2024.

== Awards and honors ==
In 2012 LaValle was named "University Scholar" along with six other professors at the University of Illinois Urbana-Champaign.

During 2015, he was featured on displays offering expert perspective in the Robot Revolution exhibit at Chicago's Museum of Science and Industry.

In 2019, LaValle (with James J. Kuffner Jr.) received the Milestone Award from the International Conference on Robotics and Automation, for the most impactful paper (among around 3000) published between 1997 and 2001.
