= Shimo-Togari Station =

Railway station in Nagaizumi, Shizuoka Prefecture, Japan

CB16 Shimo-Togari Station 下土狩駅
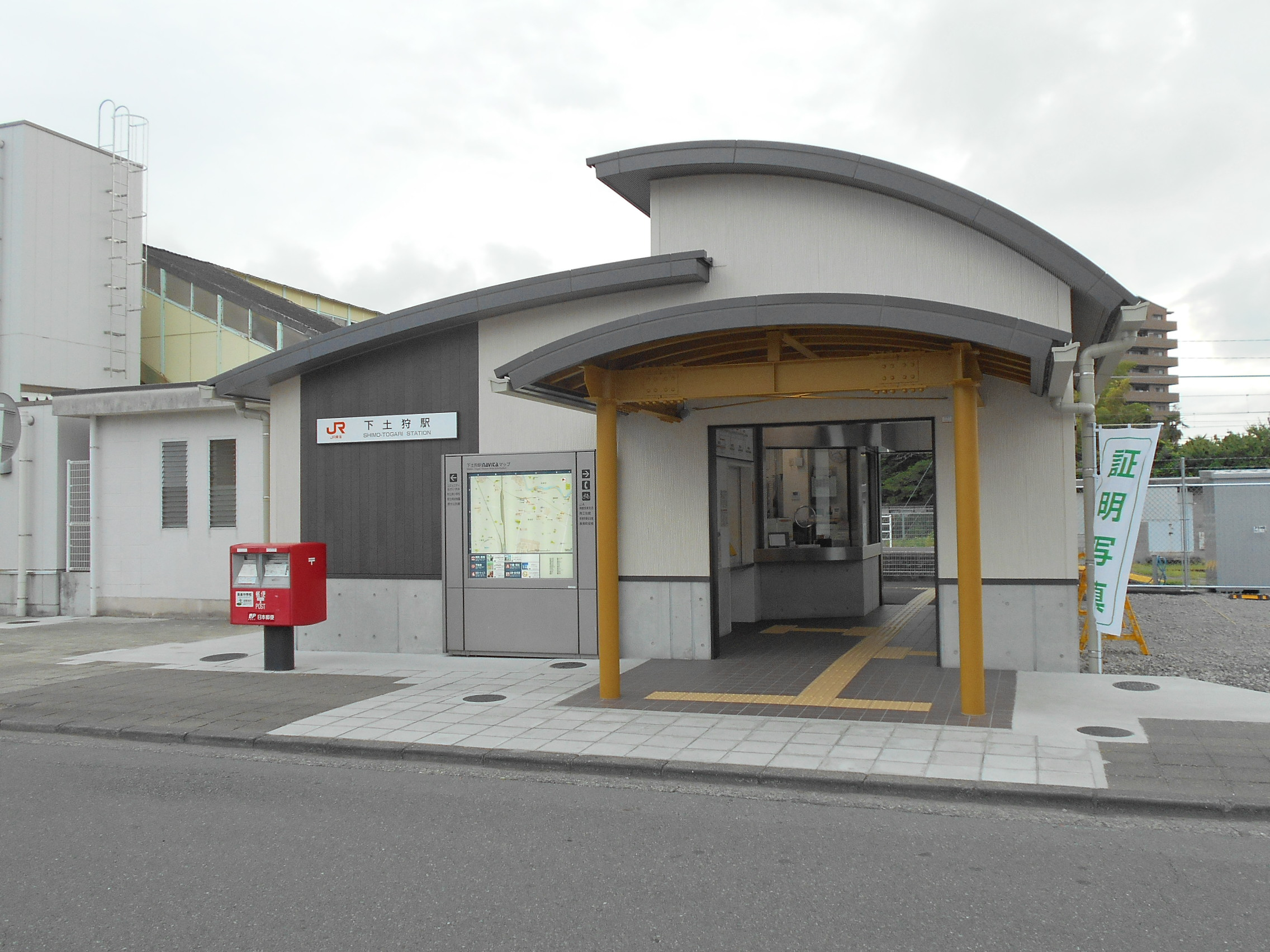
- Entrance to Shimo-Togari Station in July 2017

General information
- Location: Shimo-Togari 1283-9, Nagaizumi-cho, Suntō-gun, Shizuoka-ken; Japan
- Coordinates: 35°7′47″N 138°53′43″E
- Operator: JR Central
- Line: Gotemba Line
- Distance: 55.6 kilometers from Kōzu
- Platforms: 1 island platform

Other information
- Status: Staffed
- Station code: CB16

History
- Opened: August 1, 1944
- Former names: Mishima (to 1934)

Passengers
- FY2017: 1354 daily

Services
Preceding station	JR Central	Following station
Ōoka CB17 towards Numazu	Gotemba Line	Nagaizumi-Nameri CB15 towards Kōzu
Location
- Location within Shizuoka Prefecture Location within Japan

Shimo-Togari Station (下土狩駅, Shimo-Togari-eki) is a railway station in the town of Nagaizumi, Shizuoka Prefecture, Japan, operated by the Central Japan Railway Company (JR Central).

== Lines ==
Shimo-Togari Station is served by the JR Central Gotemba Line, and is located 55.6 kilometers from the official starting point of the line at Kōzu.

== Station layout ==
The station has a single island platform. The station building is to the east of tracks and connected to the platform with a footbridge. It has automated ticket machines, TOICA automated turnstiles, and a staffed ticket office.

=== Platforms ===
1	■ Gotemba Line	for Numazu
2	■ Gotemba Line	for Susono, Gotemba, Matsuda, and Kōzu

=== Gallery ===
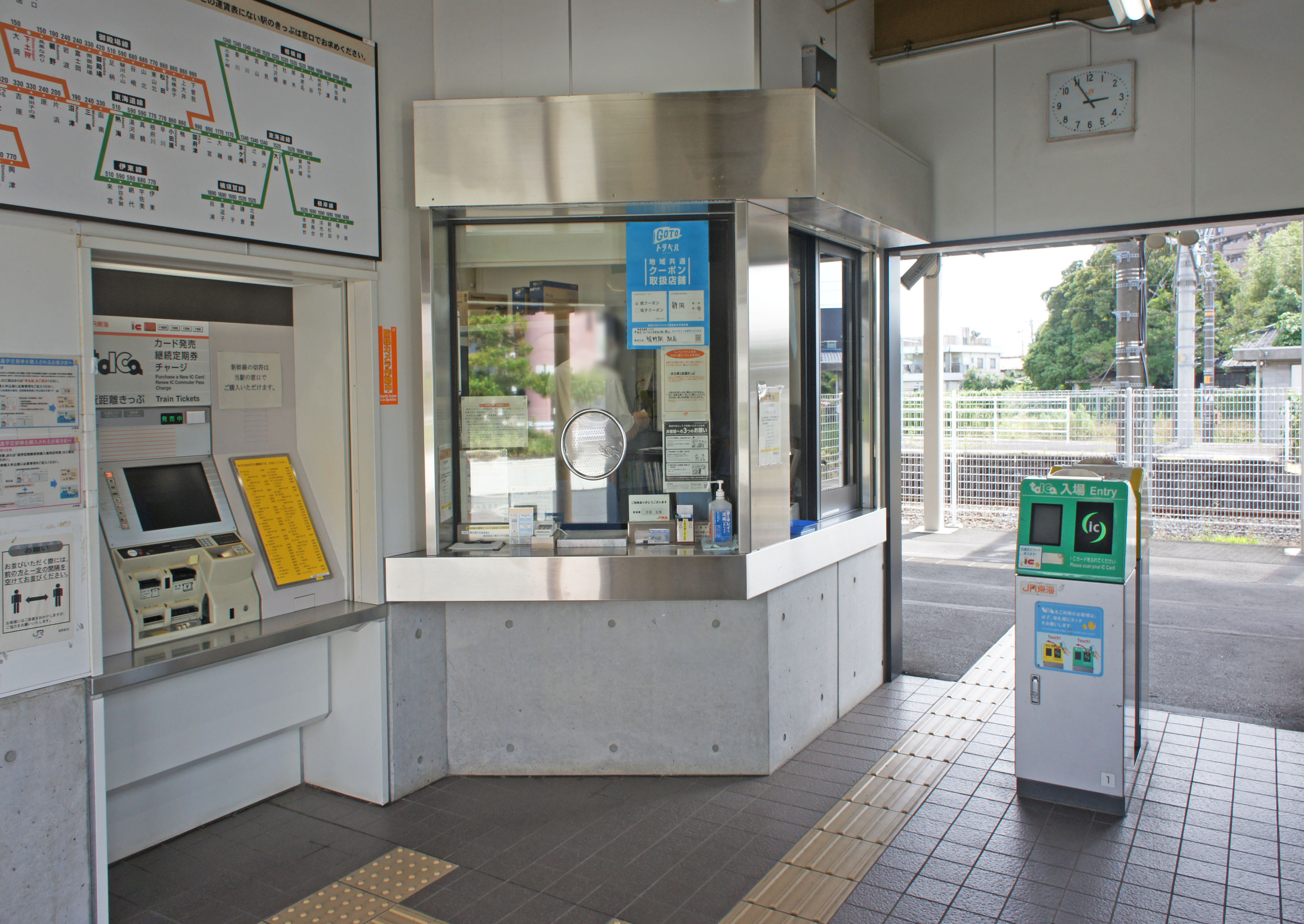
Station Gate (June 2022)

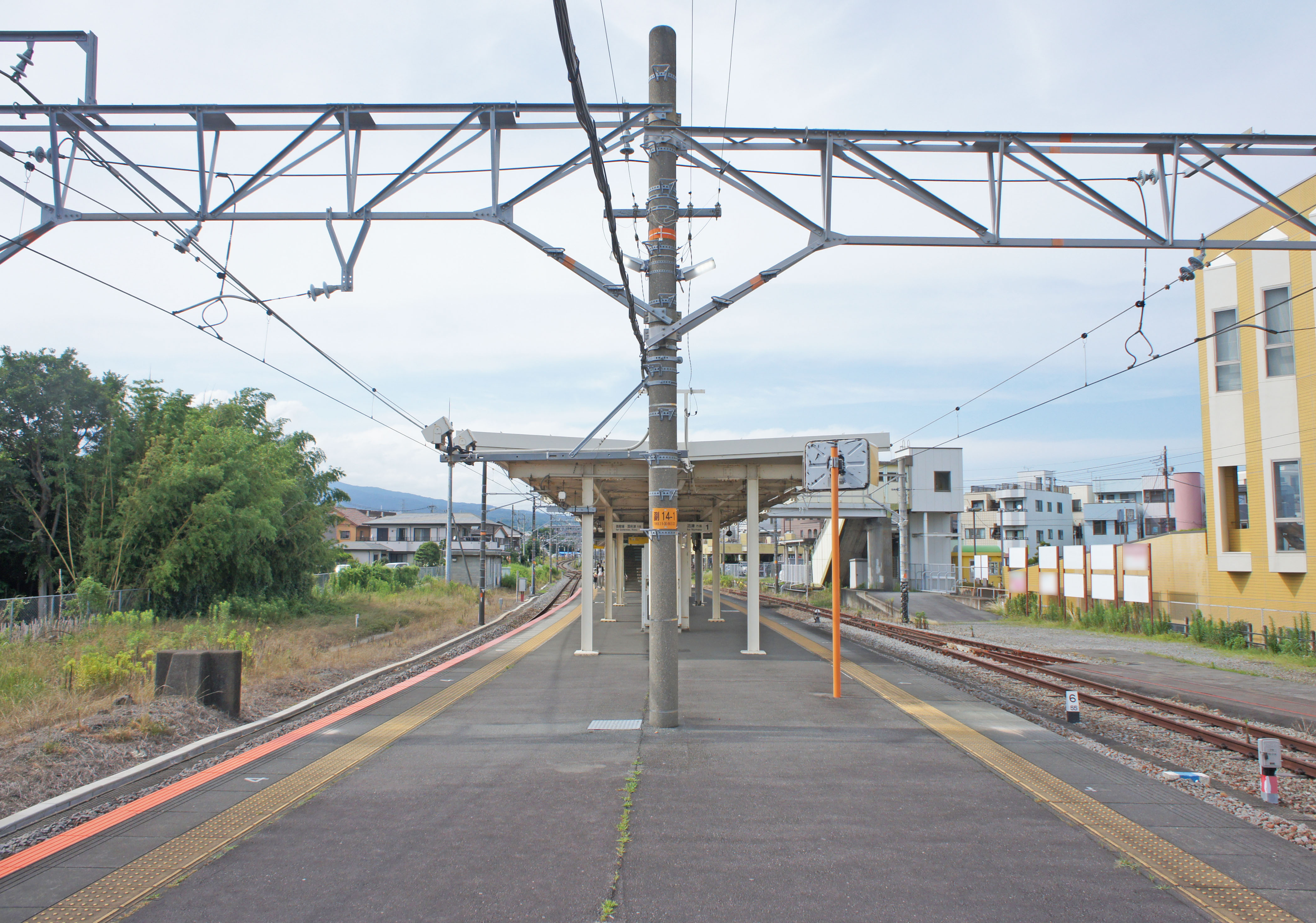
Station Platform (June 2022)

== History ==
The station first opened on June 15, 1898 as Mishima Station on the original route of the Tōkaidō Main Line under the Japanese Government Railways. It was renamed Shimo-Togari Station on October 1, 1934 shortly before the opening of the Tanna Tunnel created a more direct route from Atami to Numazu and led to the creation of a new Mishima Station further south. JGR became the Japanese National Railways (JNR) from 1946. Regularly scheduled freight operations were suspended from 1982. Along with privatization and division of JNR, JR Central started operating the station from April 1, 1987.

Station numbering was introduced to the Gotemba Line in March 2018; Shimo-Togari Station was assigned station number CB16.

== Passenger statistics ==
In fiscal 2017, the station was used by an average of 1354 passengers daily (boarding passengers only).

== Surrounding area ==
- Ayutsubo Falls
- Numazu Technical High School

== See also ==
- List of railway stations in Japan
