= Rapidly exploring dense trees =

Rapidly exploring dense trees is a family of planning algorithms that includes the rapidly exploring random tree.
