= Johann Borenstein =

Israeli roboticist

- Education: Technion
- Scientific career
- Fields: Robotics
- Workplaces: University of Michigan

Johann Borenstein is an Israeli roboticist and Professor at the University of Michigan. Borenstein is well known for his work in autonomous obstacle avoidance, and is credited with the development of the Vector Field Histogram.

Borenstein received his B.Sc., M.Sc., and D.Sc. degrees in mechanical engineering from the Technion in 1981, 1983, and 1987, respectively.
