= Susono =

Susono 裾野市
- City
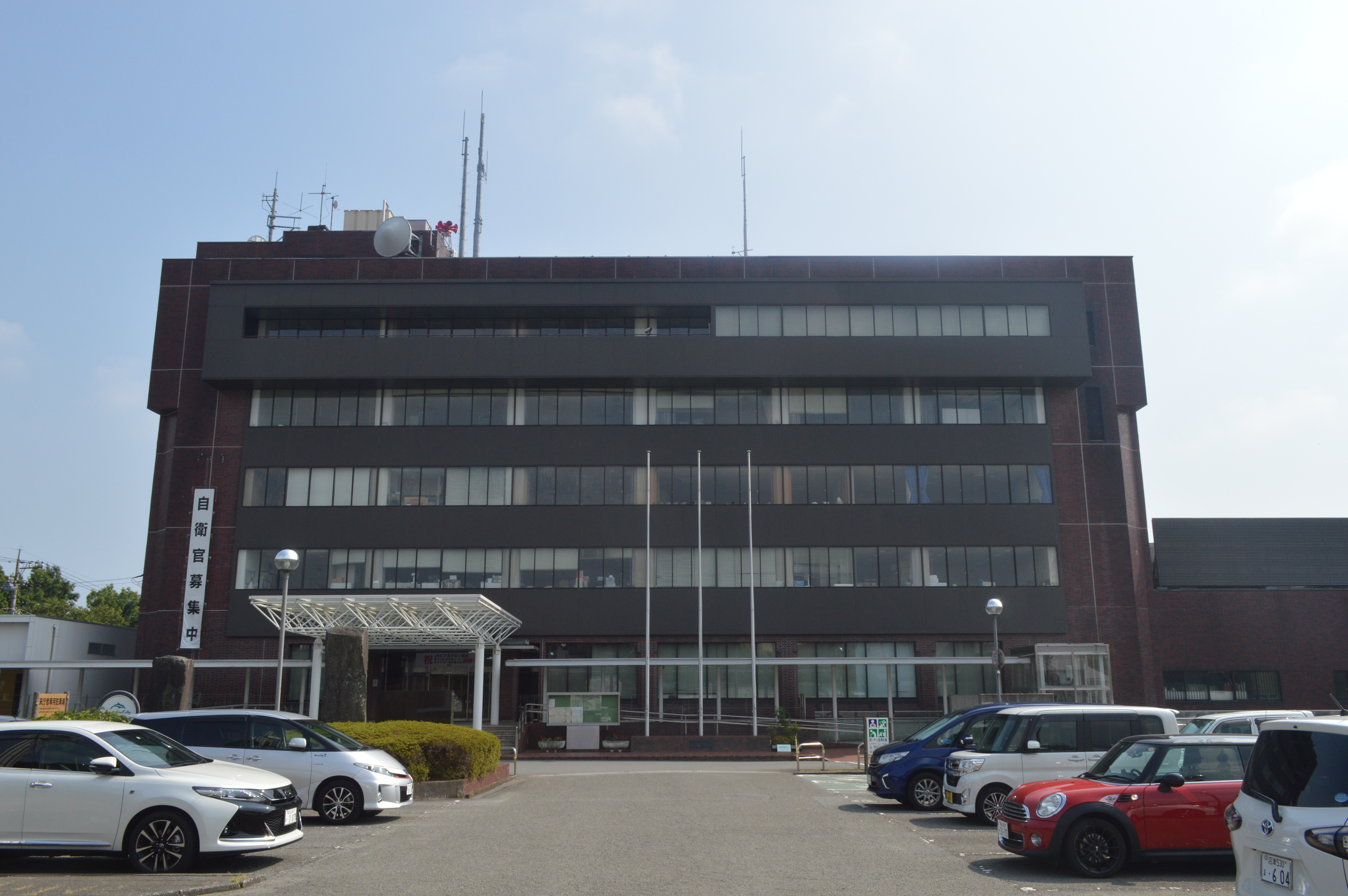
- Susono City Hall

- Flag Seal

- Location of Susono in Shizuoka Prefecture

- Coordinates: 35°10′26.2″N 138°54′24.4″E
- Country: Japan
- Region: Chūbu (Tōkai)
- Prefecture: Shizuoka
- First official recorded: 110 AD (official)
- Town settled: April 1, 1952
- City settled: January 1, 1971

Government
  - Mayor: Harukaze Murata (from January 2022)

Area
  - Total: 138.12 km^{2} (53.33 sq mi)

Population (December 2020)
  - Total: 51,216
  - Density: 370.81/km^{2} (960.39/sq mi)
- Time zone: UTC+9 (Japan Standard Time)
- Tree: Japanese cedar
- Flower: Azalea
- Bird: Bush warbler
- Phone number: 055-992-2640
- Address: 1059 Sano, Susono-shi, Shizuoka-ken 410-1192
- Website: Official website

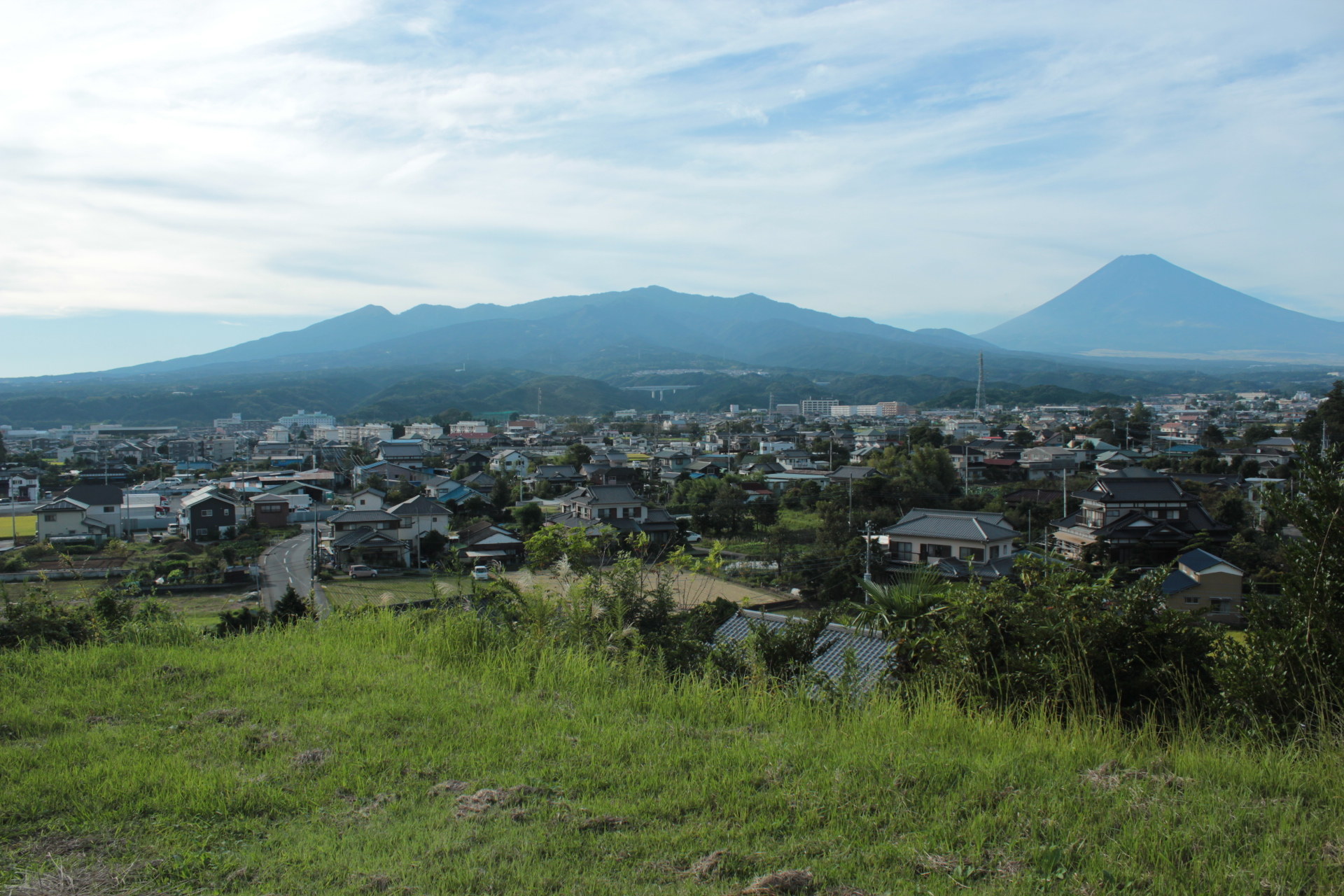
Susono with Mount Fuji

Susono (裾野市, Susono-shi) is a city located in eastern Shizuoka Prefecture, Japan. As of 1 December 2020, the city had an estimated population of 51,216 in 21,858 households, and a population density of 370 persons per km^{2}. The total area of the city is 138.12 square kilometres (53.33 sq mi).

== Mottos of Susono city ==
1. Enjoy working and make a healthy city.
2. Be kind to people and make living in the city more pleasant.
3. Maintain social order and build a peaceful city.
4. Protect nature and make a beautiful city.
5. Respect old traditions and make a cultured city.

== Geography ==
Susono is located in far eastern Shizuoka Prefecture, Japan, in the foothills of Mount Fuji, Mount Ashitaka, and the Hakone Mountains. The climate is temperate maritime, with hot humid summers and mild winters.

=== Surrounding municipalities ===
Kanagawa Prefecture

- Hakone

Shizuoka Prefecture

- Fuji
- Gotemba
- Mishima
- Nagaizumi

== Demographics ==
Per Japanese census data, the population of Susono has been increasing over the past 70 years.

Historical population
Year	Pop.	±%
1940	16,530	—
1950	22,072	+33.5%
1960	22,336	+1.2%
1970	31,612	+41.5%
1980	41,025	+29.8%
1990	49,039	+19.5%
2000	52,682	+7.4%
2010	54,528	+3.5%

=== Climate ===
The city has a climate characterized by hot and humid summers, and relatively mild winters (Köppen climate classification Cfa). The average annual temperature in Susono is 13.8 °C. The average annual rainfall is 1916 mm with September as the wettest month. The temperatures are highest on average in August, at around 25.0 °C, and lowest in January, at around 3.3 °C.

== History ==
During the Edo period, the area was mostly tenryō territory under direct control of the Tokugawa shogunate. After the Meiji Restoration, on February 1, 1889, a train station was opened in the center of rural Suntō District on what later became the Tōkaidō Main Line connecting Tokyo with Shizuoka. With the establishment of the modern municipalities system in April of the same year, the area was reorganized into 24 villages. Originally called "Sano Station", the train station was renamed Susono Station in 1915. Susono Town was founded on April 4, 1952, through the merger of Koizumi and Izumi Villages. On September 30, 1956, Fukara Village merged with Susono Town, and on September 1, 1957, Tomioka and Suyama Villages also merged. Susono became a city on January 1, 1971. The design of the city flag represents the union of the original five villages.

== Government ==
Susono has a mayor-council form of government with a directly elected mayor and a unicameral city legislature of 19 members.

== Economy ==
Susono has a mixed economy. As an industrial city, it hosts several automobile or automotive components plants, including a plant owned by Toyota and one by its subsidiary Kanto Auto Works. Mitsubishi Aluminum Corporation and Canon also have factories in the city. In April, 2007, the head office of Yazaki Corporation, an automotive components manufacturer, was moved from Yokohama to Susono.

Agricultural products include Strawberries, bamboo shoots, and pork.

Toyota is in the process of building a smart city, Woven City, in Susono. It completed Phase 1 of the project in 2025.

== Education ==
Susono has eight public elementary schools and five public middle schools operated by the city government, and one public high school (Shizuoka Prefectural Susono High School) operated by the Shizuoka Prefectural Board of Education. There is also one private combined middle/high school.

== Transportation ==
=== Railways ===
- Central Japan Railway Company - Gotemba Line
  - Susono - Iwanami

=== Highways ===
- Tōmei Expressway
- Shin-Tōmei Expressway
- Izu-Jūkan Expressway
- National Route 246
- National Route 469

== Local attractions ==
=== Recreational facilities ===
- Campsites in Jurigi
- Chuchan Stock Farm
- Citizen Culture Center
- Fuji Safari Park]
- Gurimpa (amusement park)
- The Mount Fuji Museum
- Healthy Park Susono
- Sports Park (baseball ground, tennis court, long roller slide, large grass area to play other sports)
- Welfare Health Hall
- Yeti (ski resort)

=== Events held in Susono ===
- Japanese/English Speech Contest
- JLPGA Stanley Ladies Golf Tournament
- Mount Fuji International Snowball Fight Contest
- Mount Fuji Japanese Apricot Festival
- Mount Fuji Walking Festival
- Susono Summer Festival

== Sister cities ==
- City of Frankston, Melbourne, Australia
