= Nagaizumi-Nameri Station =

Railway station in Nagaizumi, Shizuoka Prefecture, Japan

CB15 Nagaizumi-Nameri Station 長泉なめり駅
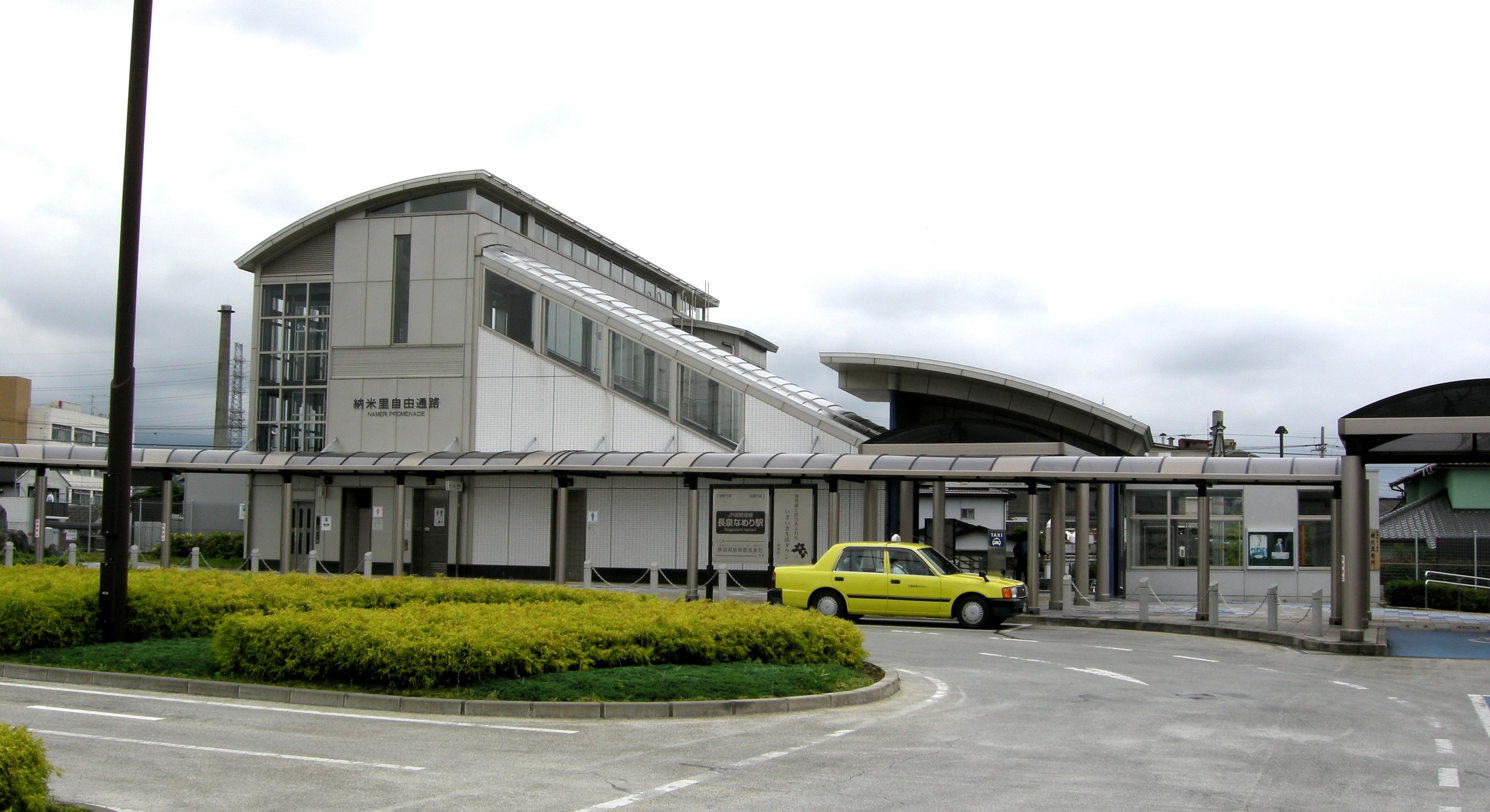
- Nagaizumi-Nameri station building, July 2007

General information
- Location: 58-6 Nameri, Nagaizumi-cho, Sunto-gun, Shizuoka-ken; Japan
- Coordinates: 35°8′51″N 138°53′57″E
- Operator: JR Central
- Line: Gotemba Line
- Distance: 53.5 kilometers from Kōzu
- Platforms: 1 side platform

Other information
- Status: Unstaffed
- Station code: CB15

History
- Opened: September 7, 2002

Passengers
- FY2017: 942 daily

Services
| Preceding station | JR Central | Following station |
|---|---|---|
| Shimo-Togari CB16 towards Numazu | Gotemba Line | Susono CB14 towards Kōzu |
Location
- Location within Shizuoka Prefecture Location within Japan

Nagaizumi-Nameri Station (長泉なめり駅, Nagaizumi-Nameri-eki) is a railway station in the town of Nagaizumi, Shizuoka Prefecture, Japan, operated by the Central Japan Railway Company (JR Central).

== Lines ==
Nagaizumi-Nameri Station is served by the JR Central Gotemba Line, and is located 53.5 kilometers from the official starting point of the line at Kōzu.

== Station layout ==
The station has a single side platform serving traffic in both directions. As part of the Shizuoka Cancer Center medical complex, the station has a Barrier-free design, with slopes for wheelchair access, elevators and moving walkways. It has automated ticket machines and TOICA automated turnstiles, but is an unstaffed station.

== History ==
Nagaizumi-Nameri Station opened as an infill station on 7 September 2002 as part of the Shizuoka Cancer Center.

Station numbering was introduced to the Gotemba Line in March 2018; Nagaizumi-Nameri Station was assigned station number CB15.

== Passenger statistics ==
In fiscal 2017, the station was used by an average of 942 passengers daily (boarding passengers only).

== Surrounding area ==
- Shizuoka Cancer Center

== See also ==
- List of railway stations in Japan
