= James J. Kuffner Jr. =

American roboticist

James Kuffner
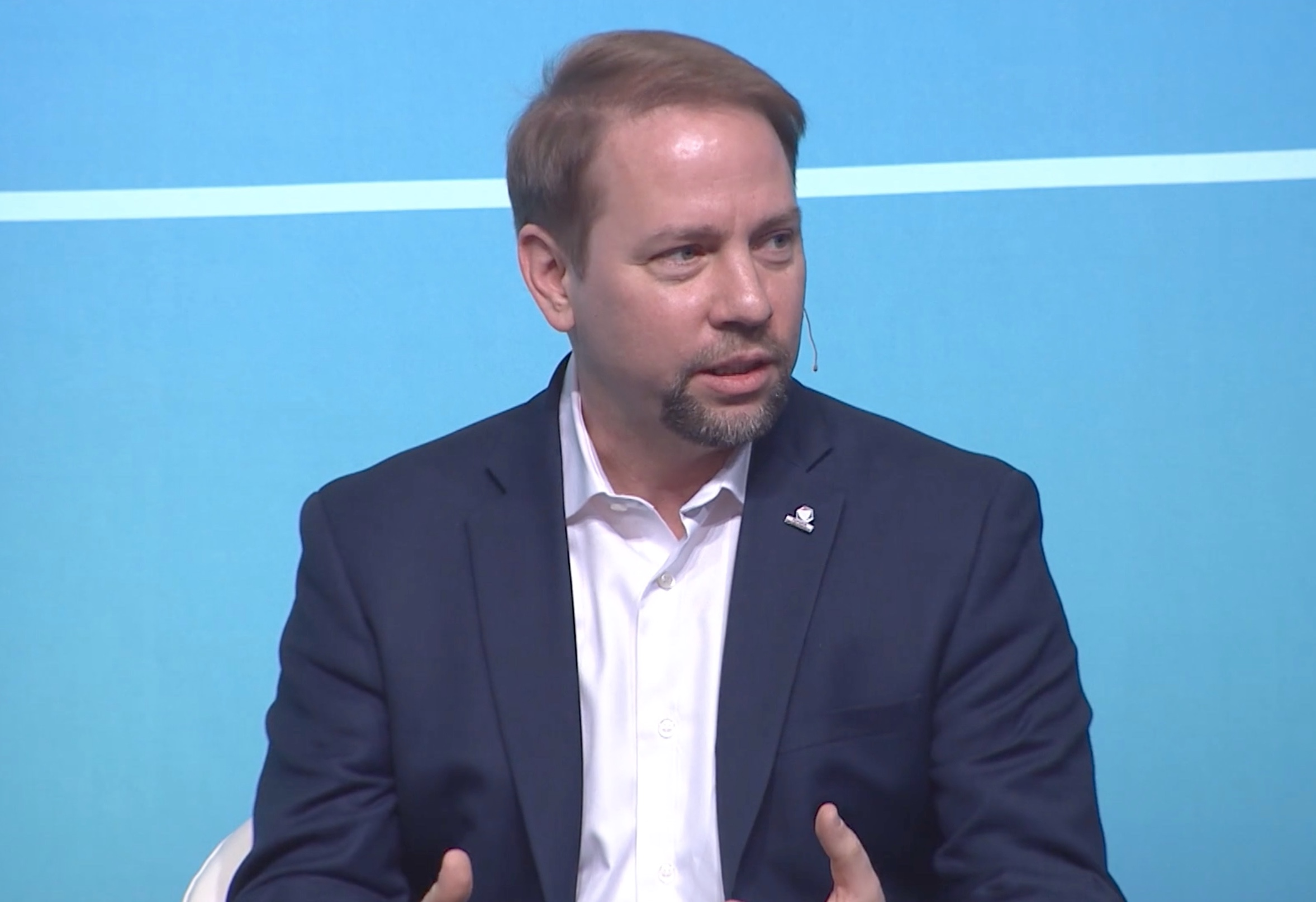
- Born: James Joseph Kuffner Jr. 1971 (age 54–55); United States
- Education: Stanford
- Known for: RRT; OpenRAVE; Cloud Robotics
- Scientific career
- Fields: Robotics
- Workplaces: CMU; Google; Toyota
- Doctoral advisor: Jean-Claude Latombe

James J. Kuffner Jr. (born 1971) is an American roboticist and former chief executive officer (CEO) of Woven by Toyota. Dr. Kuffner is also Chief Digital Officer and a member of the Board of Directors of Toyota Motor Corporation. Kuffner continues to serve as an Adjunct Associate Professor at the Robotics Institute at Carnegie Mellon University and as Executive Advisor to Woven by Toyota. Kuffner earned a Ph.D. from the Stanford University Dept. of Computer Science Robotics Laboratory in 1999.

== Academic research ==
Dr. Kuffner is perhaps best known as co-inventor of RRTs and the "RRT-Connect" algorithm developed as part of his Ph.D. research. The RRT-Connect algorithm has become a key standard benchmark for sampling-based exploration of high-dimensional search spaces for robot motion planning. From 1999 until 2001, Kuffner was a Japan Society for the Promotion of Science (JSPS) Postdoctoral Research Fellow at the University of Tokyo developing software and planning algorithms for humanoid robots. He joined the faculty at Carnegie Mellon University's Robotics Institute in 2002.

Dr. Kuffner is one of the most highly cited authors in the field of Robotics and Motion Planning, with over 15,000 citations. Kuffner has published over 125 technical papers and was issued more than 50 patents related to robotics and computer vision technology. Kuffner received the Okawa Foundation Award for Young Researchers in 2007.

== Google ==
Kuffner joined Google in 2009 and was a member of the software engineering team that developed the Google self-driving car. Kuffner is also known for introducing the term "Cloud Robotics" in 2010 to describe how network-connected robots could take advantage of distributed computation and data stored in the cloud.

Kuffner co-founded with Andy Rubin Google's investments in Robotics technology, built primarily from the acquisition of innovative companies such as Boston Dynamics, Schaft, Industrial Perception, Meka and Redwood Robotics. Kuffner was appointed head of the Robotics division after Andy Rubin's departure from Google in October 2014. In May 2015, Kuffner brought together researchers in robotics, computer vision, and machine learning technology within Google Research to help realize the original Cloud Robotics concept.

== Toyota ==
In Jan 2016, Dr. Kuffner joined the Toyota Research Institute (TRI) where he was appointed the Chief Technology Officer and Area Lead, Cloud Intelligence.

In March 2018, Toyota announced a $2.8 billion investment in the creation of a new company, Toyota Research Institute - Advanced Development (TRI-AD), with Dr. Kuffner as chief executive officer (CEO). TRI-AD is headquartered in Tokyo, and is reported to ultimately employ over 1,000 engineers for the development of software for automated driving and artificial intelligence.

In April 2021, Kuffner was picked to run Woven Planet, Toyota's subsidiary for developing future technology in cars. In October 2023, Kuffner gave up his job after 2½ years in the role and became a senior fellow at Toyota, working on digital-skill development and education within the company in addition to software development.
