= Bug algorithm =

Bug algorithm is a class of algorithm that helps robots deal with motion planning.

== Types ==
- Bug 1 algorithm
- Bug 2 algorithm
- Tangent bug algorithm

== Basic assumptions ==
- The robot is treated as a point inside a 2D world.
- The obstacles (if any) are unknown and nonconvex.
- There is a clearly defined starting point and goal.
- The robot is able to detect an obstacle boundary from a distance of known length.
- The robot always knows the direction and how far (in terms of Euclidean distance) it is from the goal.

== Algorithm ==
The most basic form of Bug algorithm (Bug 1) is as follows:

1. The robot moves towards the goal until an obstacle is encountered.
2. Follow a canonical direction (clockwise) until the robot reaches the location of initial encounter with the obstacle (in short, walking around the obstacle).
3. The robot then follows the obstacle's boundary to reach the point on the boundary that is closest to the goal.
4. Go back to step 1. Repeat this until the goal is reached.

== See also ==
- Pathfinding
- Motion planning
