= Woven by Toyota, Inc. =

Japanese automobile technology developer

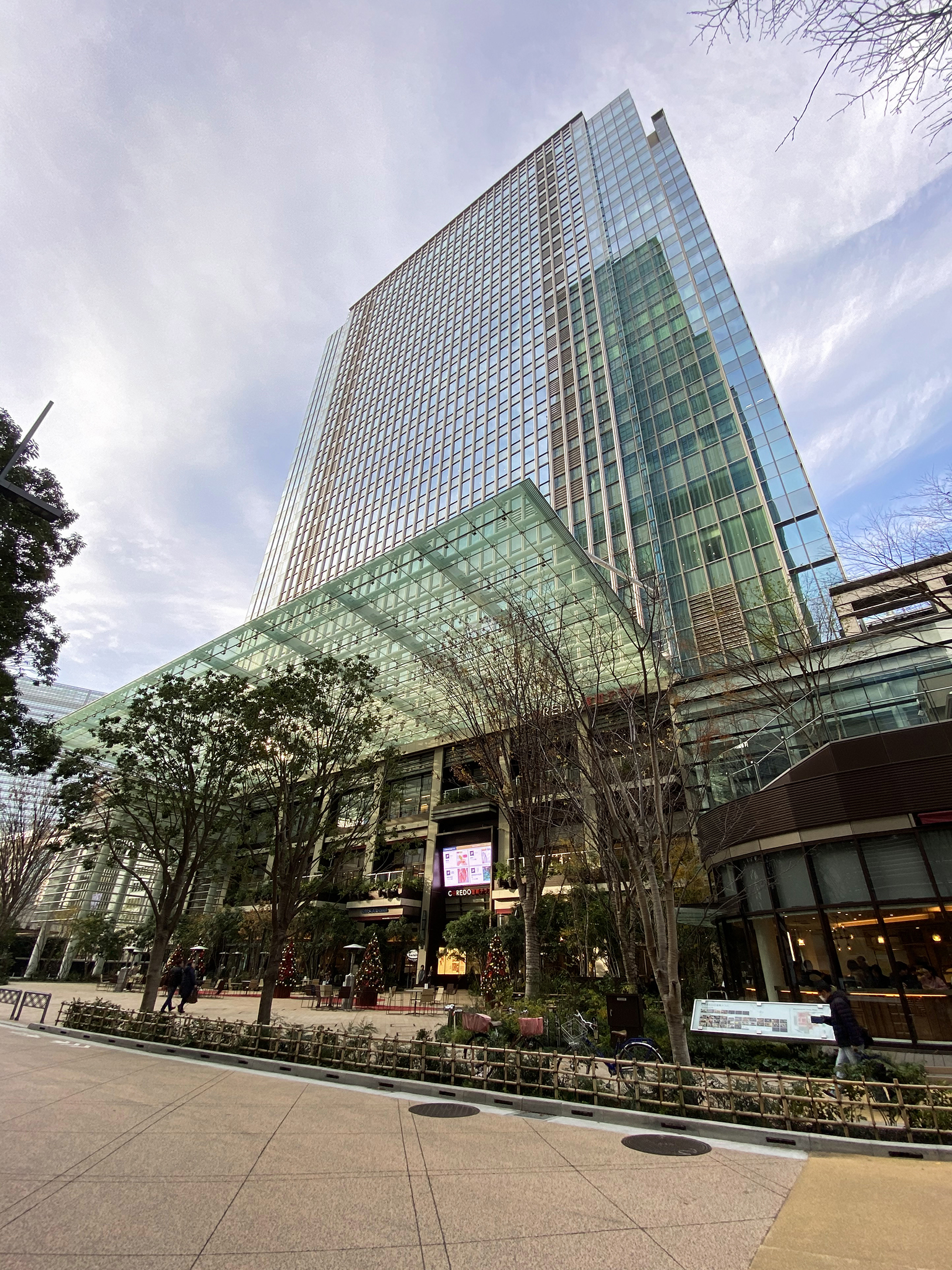
- Woven by Toyota, inside Nihonbashi Muromachi Mitsui Tower
- Formerly: Toyota Research Institute – Advanced Development; Woven Planet Holdings
- Type: Private
- Industry: Automotive
- Founded: January 2021; 5 years ago
- Headquarters: Tokyo, Japan
- Area served: International
- Key people: Hajime Kumabe, CEO; Daisuke Toyoda, Senior Vice President
- Owner: Toyota Motor Corporation (100%)
- Website: woven.toyota/en

Woven by Toyota, Inc. is the mobility technology subsidiary of Toyota Motor Corporation, creating and managing the software for Toyota's vehicle operating system, automated driving, and safety. It has founded and managed an investment fund, Woven Capital.

== Description ==
Woven by Toyota, a subsidiary of the Toyota Motor Corporation, which was formerly known as the Toyota Research Institute – Advanced Development (TRI–AD), was established by Toyota in 2018. In 2021, it was renamed to Woven Planet Holdings, Inc., and in 2023, it became known as Woven by Toyota, Inc.

Woven by Toyota develops and maintains a mobility software platform and technologies for Toyota Woven City in Japan. Woven by Toyota's former CEO and Representative Director, James Kuffner, stated, "This is a pivotal moment for the industry when software can accelerate our progress toward an advanced mobility society. Woven by Toyota plays a critical role, and our unique software platform will enable Toyota not only to build next-generation battery electric vehicles, but also to expand the value of mobility across every aspect of our lives."

=== Woven Capital ===
Woven Capital is a US$800 million (€676 million) global investment fund that was established to support the work of Woven by Toyota. The fund's money is dedicated to investment in driverless car technologies, including "autonomous mobility, automation, artificial intelligence, machine learning, data and analytics, connectivity, and smart cities."

=== Toyota Woven City ===
Woven City is a smart city project developed by Toyota Motor Corporation ("Toyota") and Woven by Toyota, Inc. ("WbyT"). Announced at CES 2020 and officially launched in September 2025 in Susono, Shizuoka Prefecture, Japan, the project functions as a real-world testing ground for technologies related to mobility, robotics, energy systems and smart infrastructure.

The concept is intended to bring together social infrastructure, mobility solutions, and everyday life, allowing residents, researchers and partner companies to trial new technologies in a city-like environment. The development is guided by three principles: a "living laboratory", "human-centered", and an "ever-evolving city".

After the groundbreaking ceremony held in February 2021, Toyota Woven City officially transitioned from a concept to an operational site. Vertical construction of phase 1 was completed in October 2024, then a formal ceremony for phase completion was held in February 22, 2025. The demonstration phase was officially launched on September 25, 2025, welcoming the first residents, also known as "Weavers". The first residents, mainly Toyota employees and their families, consists of around 360 people.

The city serves as a place of rapid innovation where residents and innovators (partner companies) create and test new technologies in mobility and robotics. Innovation in infrastructure includes a hydrogen refueling station built with ENEOS to power city's fuel cell systems. In 2023, the project became the first recipient of LEED for Communities Platinum certification for its sustainable design in Japan. The city is planned to open to the general public in 2026 fiscal year, targeting a population of 2,000 residents.

== History ==
Toyota Research Institute – Advanced Development (TRI–AD) began in 2018, a joint venture among Toyota, Denso, and Aisin to unify and strengthen Toyota's software for automated driving and safety. James Kuffner became the CEO.

In January 2021, Woven Planet Holdings, Inc. was established.

In April 2021, Woven by Toyota (then Woven Planet Holdings) agreed to acquire Lyft's Level 5 self-driving vehicle division. Financing included US$550 million in cash with $200 million paid upfront and $350 million of payments over five year period. Woven by Toyota CEO and Representative Director James Kuffner said the acquisition assembled "a dream team of world-class engineers and scientists to deliver safe mobility technology for the world."

In July 2021, Woven by Toyota (then Woven Planet Holdings) also acquired CARMERA, Inc., a company that "specializes in sophisticated road mapping updates made cheaper and faster by using crowdsourced information obtained in real time from millions of net-connected Toyota vehicles."

In September 2021, Woven by Toyota (then Woven Planet Holdings) acquired Renovo Motors, Inc., a Silicon Valley developer of automotive operating systems.

In April 2023, Woven Planet Holdings, Inc. was renamed to Woven by Toyota, Inc.

In October 2023, Hajime Kumabe was named the CEO of Woven by Toyota.

Daisuke Toyoda, the eldest son of Akio Toyoda, the chairman of Toyota Group, serves as a founding member and senior vice president of Woven by Toyota.

== See also ==
- Automotive navigation system
- Autopilot
- Advanced Driver Assistance Systems
- Connected car
- Hybrid navigation
- List of self-driving system suppliers
- Mobility as a service (transport)
- Vehicle infrastructure integration
- Vehicle safety technology
- Toyota
