= Trajectory (disambiguation) =

A trajectory is the path a moving object follows through space.

Types of trajectories include:

- Trajectory of a projectile
  - Lofted trajectory, a particular type of non-minimum energy ballistic trajectory
- Trajectory (fluid mechanics), the motion of a point in a moving fluid
- In motion planning, the trajectory of a robotic motion
- Phase space trajectories of dynamical systems

Trajectory may also refer to:

- Trajectory (comics), a DC Comics character
  - Trajectory (The Flash episode), an episode of the U.S. TV series The Flash that includes the character
  - Trajectory (Arrowverse), a fictional character appearing in the Arrowverse television franchise
- Trajectory Hermeneutics, a liberal teaching of Christian Postmodernism
- Trajectory Inc., an American ebook platform
- Trajectory optimization, the process of minimizing or maximizing performance
- In finance, the end point from source spending (where the money goes)
- In cricket, trajectory is known as flight or loop
- In writing, trajectory is an informative discussion (or map) of the various avenues texts can travel as they both affect, and are affected by, the world.
