= Iwanami Station =

Railway station in Susono, Shizuoka Prefecture, Japan

CB13 Iwanami Station 岩波駅
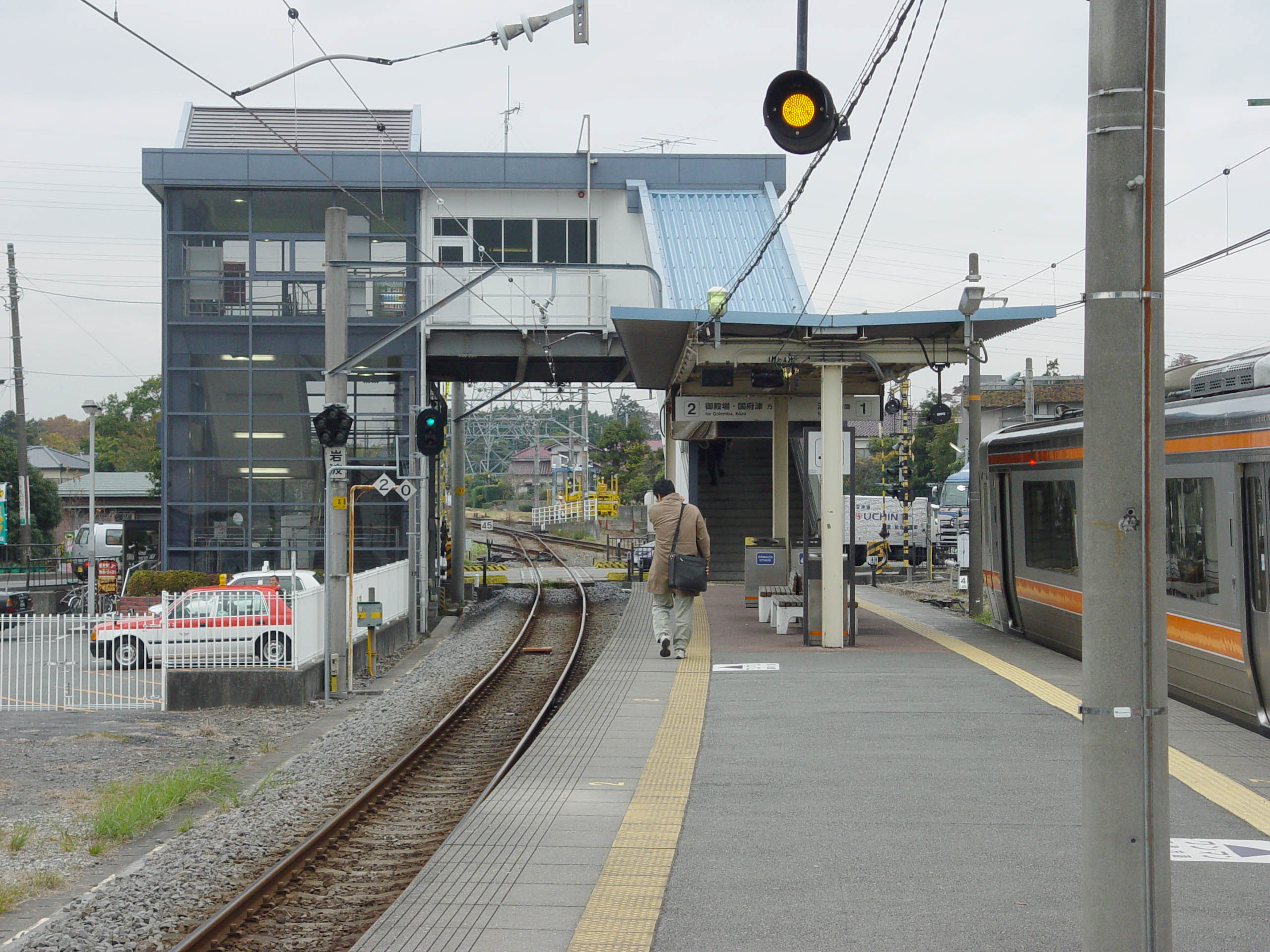
- Iwanami station building and platform, November 2006

General information
- Location: Iwanami 64-1, Susono-shi, Shizuoka-ken; Japan
- Coordinates: 35.216075°N 138.91912°E
- Operator: JR Central
- Line: Gotemba Line
- Distance: 45.3 kilometers from Kōzu
- Platforms: 1 island platform

Other information
- Status: Staffed ("Midori no Madoguchi")
- Station code: CB13

History
- Opened: August 1, 1944

Passengers
- FY2017: 2134 daily

Services
| Preceding station | JR Central | Following station |
|---|---|---|
| Susono CB14 towards Numazu | Gotemba Line | Fujioka CB12 towards Kōzu |
Location
- Location within Shizuoka Prefecture Location within Japan

Iwanami Station (岩波駅, Iwanami-eki) is a railway station in the city of Susono, Shizuoka Prefecture, Japan, operated by the Central Japan Railway Company (JR Central).

== Lines ==
Iwanami Station is served by the JR Central Gotemba Line, and is located 45.3 kilometers from the official starting point of the line at Kōzu.

== Station layout ==
The station has a single island platform connected to the station building by a footbridge. The station was originally located on a switchback, which was eliminated when the line was electrified in 1968, and the platform realigned; a vestigal remnant of the former switchback is retained as a side track to the north of the station. The station building has automated ticket machines, TOICA automated turnstiles and a staffed ticket office.

=== Platforms ===
| 1 | ■ Gotemba Line | for Numazu |
| 2 | ■ Gotemba Line | for Gotemba and Kōzu |

== History ==
Iwanami Station began opened on December 8, 1944. Along with its division and privatization of JNR on April 1, 1987, the station came under the control and operation of JR Central. The current station building dates from 1989.

Station numbering was introduced to the Gotemba Line in March 2018; Iwanami Station was assigned station number CB13.

== Passenger statistics ==
In fiscal 2017, the station was used by an average of 2134 passengers daily (boarding passengers only).

== Surrounding area ==
- Japan National Route 246
- Toyota Motor East Japan Higashi-Fuji plant

== See also ==
- List of railway stations in Japan
