= Shizuoka Prefectural Susono High School =

Coordinates: 35°10′44.23″N 138°54′34.38″E

- Susono, Shizuoka Prefecture; Japan

Information
- Website: http://www.edu.pref.shizuoka.jp/susono-h/home.nsf

Shizuoka Prefectural Susono High School (静岡県立裾野高等学校) is a public high school in Susono, Shizuoka, Japan. This school is usually called 裾野高校 (susono-kōkō).

== History ==
In 1903 Shizuoka Prefectural Susono High School was established as "Sano Agricultural Mechanics School", then in 1921 it became "Shizuoka-ken Sano Business School". In 1948 the school was renamed "Shizuoka Prefectural Namazu Agricultural High School Sano Pasture", and finally in 1953 the school "Shizuoka Prefectural Susono High School" became independent from "Shizuoka Prefectural Numazu Agricultural High School".

== Location ==
The School is located at 410-1118, 901-1 Sano, Susono-shi, Shizuoka-ken, Japan.
