= Dynamic window approach =

Method for avoiding collisions in robots

In robotics motion planning, the dynamic window approach is an online collision avoidance strategy for mobile robots developed by Dieter Fox, Wolfram Burgard, and Sebastian Thrun in 1997. Unlike other avoidance methods, the dynamic window approach is derived directly from the dynamics of the robot, and is especially designed to deal with the constraints imposed by limited velocities and accelerations of the robot.

It consists of two main components, first generating a valid search space, and second selecting an optimal solution in the search space. In Fox et al. the search space is restricted to safe circular trajectories that can be reached within a short time interval and are free from collisions. The optimization goal is to select a heading and velocity that brings the robot to the goal with the maximum clearance from any obstacle.
