= Susono Station =

Railway station in Susono, Shizuoka Prefecture, Japan

CB14 Susono Station 裾野駅
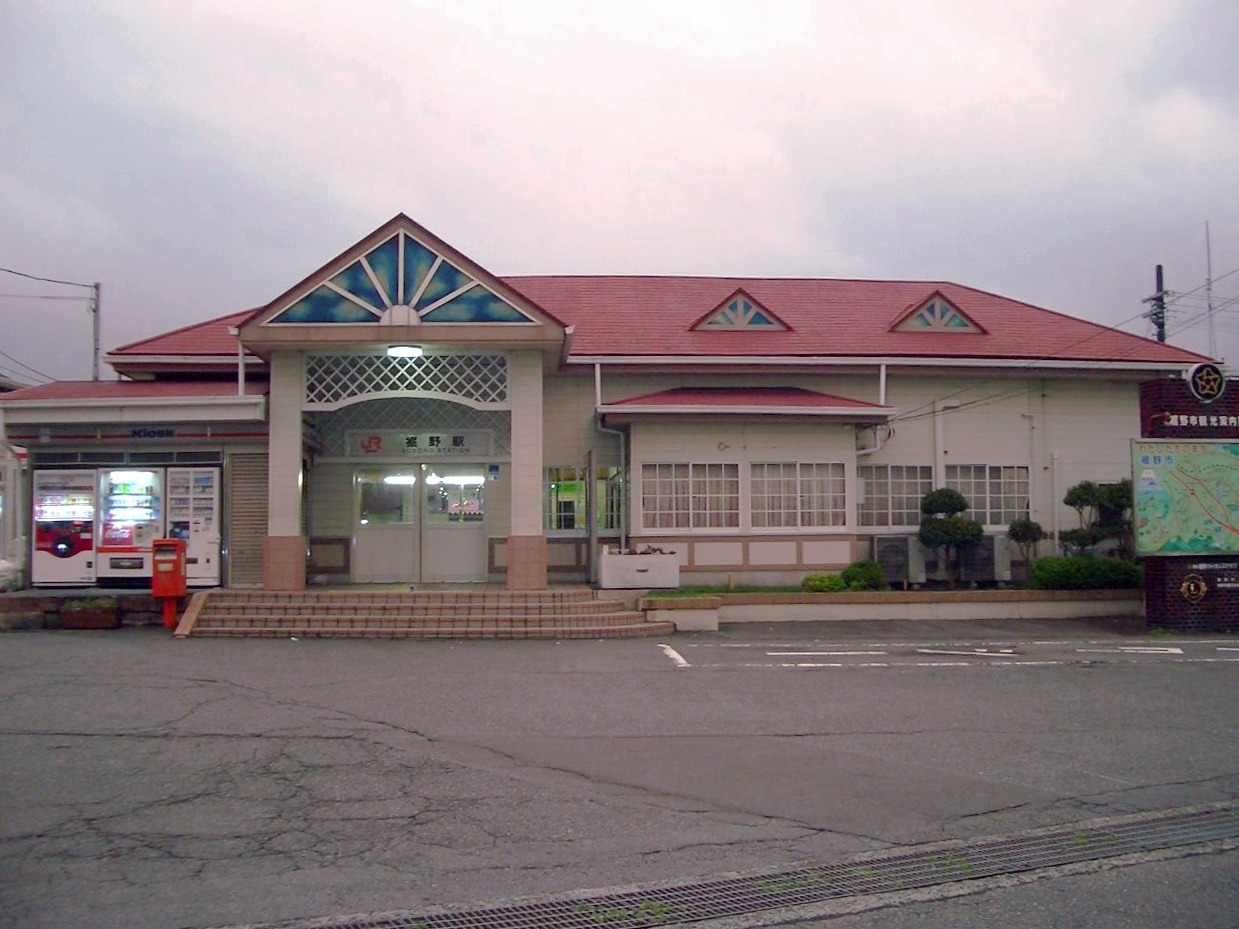
- Susono Station in August 2007

General information
- Location: Hiramatsu 378-1, Susono-shi, Shizuoka-ken; Japan
- Coordinates: 35°10′19.10″N 138°54′33.51″E
- Operator: JR Central
- Line: Gotemba Line
- Distance: 50.7 kilometers from Kōzu
- Platforms: 1 island platform

Other information
- Status: Staffed
- Station code: CB14

History
- Opened: February 1, 1889
- Former names: Sano (to 1915)

Passengers
- FY2017: 2566 daily

Services
Preceding station	JR Central	Following station
Nagaizumi-Nameri CB15 towards Numazu	Gotemba Line	Iwanami CB13 towards Kōzu
Location
- Location within Shizuoka Prefecture Location within Japan

Susono Station (すそのえき, Susono-eki) is a railway station in the city of Susono, Shizuoka Prefecture, Japan, operated by the Central Japan Railway Company (JR Central).

== Lines ==
Susono Station is served by the JR Central Gotemba Line, and is located 50.7 kilometers from the official starting point of the line at Kōzu.

== Station layout ==
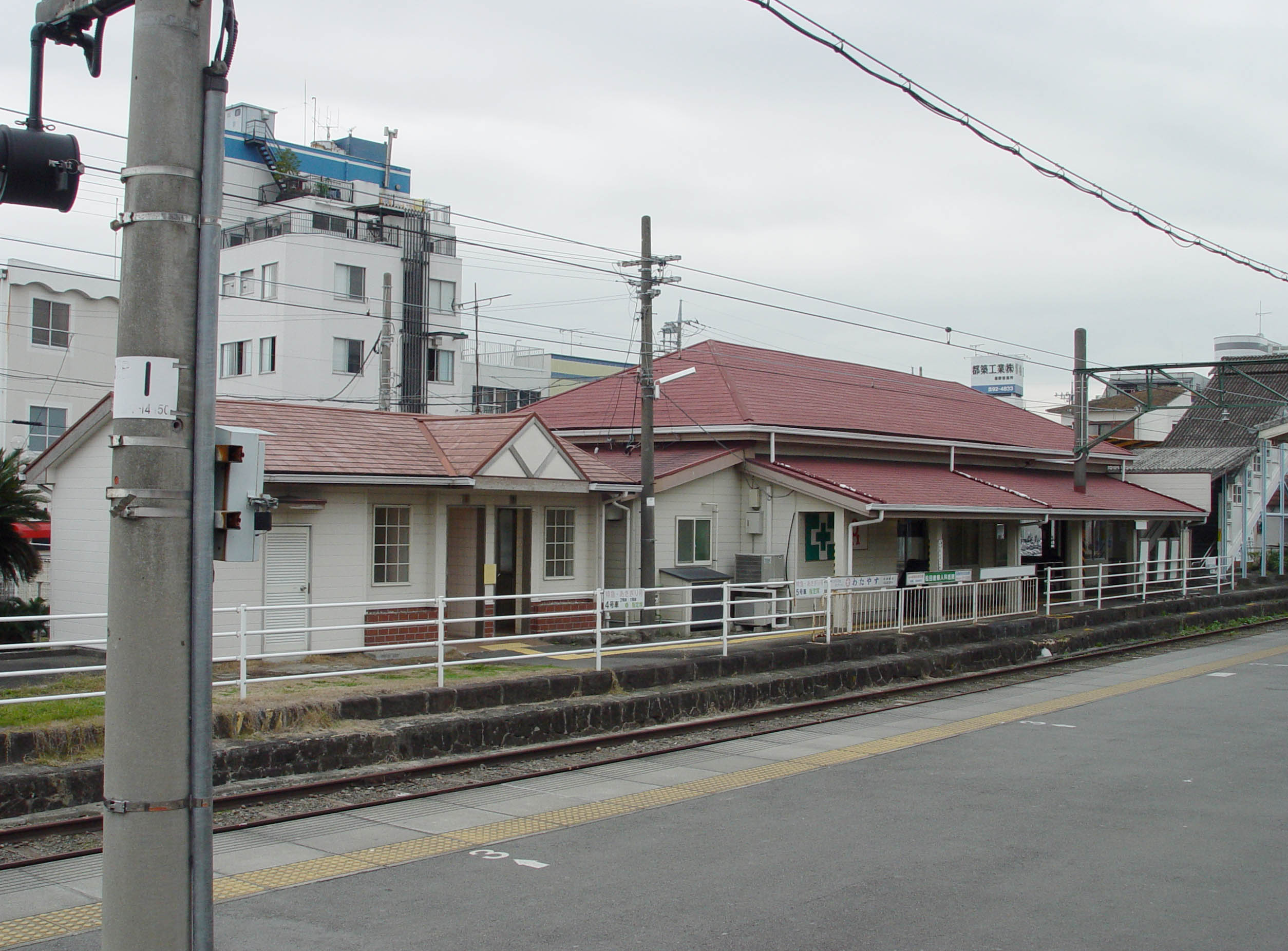
Susono Station building taken from the platform

The station has a single island platform. The station building has automated ticket machines, TOICA automated turnstiles and a staffed ticket office. It is located to the west of tracks and is connected to the platform with a footbridge.

=== Platforms ===
1	■ Gotemba Line	for Numazu
2	■ Gotemba Line	for Gotemba and Kōzu

== History ==
The station first opened as Sano Station (佐野駅) under the Japanese Government Railways (JGR), (the predecessor to the post-war Japanese National Railways) on February 1, 1889. It was renamed Susono Station on July 15, 1915. After the opening of the Tanna Tunnel on December 1, 1934, it became a station of the Gotemba Line. Regularly scheduled freight services were discontinued on March 10, 1974 and baggage-handling services from February 1, 1984. Along with its division and privatization of JNR on April 1, 1987, the station came under the control and operation of JR Central.

Station numbering was introduced to the Gotemba Line in March 2018; Susono Station was assigned station number CB14.

== Passenger statistics ==
In fiscal 2017, the station was used by an average of 2566 passengers daily (boarding passengers only).

== Surrounding area ==
- Susono City Hall
- Susono High School

== See also ==
- List of railway stations in Japan
