= Motion planning =

Computational problem

Motion planning, also path planning (also known as the navigation problem or the piano mover's problem) is a computational problem to find a sequence of valid configurations that moves the object from the source to destination. The term is used in computational geometry, computer animation, robotics and computer games.

For example, consider navigating a mobile robot inside a building to a distant waypoint. It should execute this task while avoiding walls and not falling down stairs. A motion planning algorithm would take a description of these tasks as input, and produce the speed and turning commands sent to the robot's wheels. Motion planning algorithms might address robots with a larger number of joints (e.g., industrial manipulators), more complex tasks (e.g. manipulation of objects), different constraints (e.g., a car that can only drive forward), and uncertainty (e.g. imperfect models of the environment or robot).

Motion planning has several robotics applications, such as autonomy, automation, and robot design in CAD software, as well as applications in other fields, such as animating digital characters, video game, architectural design, robotic surgery, and the study of biological molecules.

== Concepts ==
Example of a workspace

Configuration space of a point-sized robot. White = C_{free}, gray = C_{obs}.

Configuration space for a rectangular translating robot (pictured red). White = C_{free}, gray = C_{obs}, where dark gray = the objects, light gray = configurations where the robot would touch an object or leave the workspace.

Example of a valid path

Example of an invalid path

Example of a road map

A basic motion planning problem is to compute a continuous path that connects a start configuration S and a goal configuration G, while avoiding collision with known obstacles. The robot and obstacle geometry is described in a 2D or 3D workspace, while the motion is represented as a path in (possibly higher-dimensional) configuration space.

=== Configuration space ===
A configuration describes the pose of the robot, and the configuration space C is the set of all possible configurations. For example:

- If the robot is a single point (zero-sized) translating in a 2-dimensional plane (the workspace), C is a plane, and a configuration can be represented using two parameters (x, y).
- If the robot is a 2D shape that can translate and rotate, the workspace is still 2-dimensional. However, C is the special Euclidean group SE(2) = R^{2} $\times$ SO(2) (where SO(2) is the special orthogonal group of 2D rotations), and a configuration can be represented using 3 parameters (x, y, θ).
- If the robot is a solid 3D shape that can translate and rotate, the workspace is 3-dimensional, but C is the special Euclidean group SE(3) = R^{3} $\times$ SO(3), then the configuration requires 6 parameters: (x, y, z) for translation, and Euler angles (α, β, γ).
- If the robot is a fixed-base manipulator with N revolute joints (and no closed-loops), C is N-dimensional.
- If gimbal lock is not acceptable (e.g. in R^{N} where N ≥ 3 ) then the use of quaternions or other workarounds may be required, increasing the rotational dimensions or solution's complexity.

=== Free space ===
The set of configurations that avoids collision with obstacles is called the free space C_{free}. The complement of C_{free} in C is called the obstacle or forbidden region.

Often, it is prohibitively difficult to explicitly compute the shape of C_{free}. However, testing whether a given configuration is in C_{free} is efficient. First, forward kinematics determine the position of the robot's geometry, and collision detection tests if the robot's geometry collides with the environment's geometry.

=== Target space ===
Target space is a subspace of free space which denotes where we want the robot to move to. In global motion planning, target space is observable by the robot's sensors. However, in local motion planning, the robot cannot observe the target space in some states. To solve this problem, the robot goes through several virtual target spaces, each of which is located within the observable area (around the robot). A virtual target space is called a sub-goal.

=== Obstacle space ===
Obstacle space is a space that the robot can not move to. Obstacle space is not opposite of free space.

== Algorithms ==
Low-dimensional problems can be solved with grid-based algorithms that overlay a grid on top of configuration space, or geometric algorithms that compute the shape and connectivity of C_{free}.

Exact motion planning for high-dimensional systems under complex constraints is computationally intractable. Potential-field algorithms are efficient, but fall prey to local minima (an exception is the harmonic potential fields). Sampling-based algorithms avoid the problem of local minima, and solve many problems quite quickly. They are unable to determine that no path exists, but they have a probability of failure that decreases to zero as more time is spent.

Sampling-based algorithms are currently considered state-of-the-art for motion planning in high-dimensional spaces, and have been applied to problems which have dozens or even hundreds of dimensions (robotic manipulators, biological molecules, animated digital characters, and legged robots).

=== Grid-based search ===
Grid-based approaches overlay a grid on configuration space and assume each configuration is identified with a grid point. At each grid point, the robot is allowed to move to adjacent grid points as long as the line between them is completely contained within C_{free} (this is tested with collision detection). This discretizes the set of actions, and search algorithms (like A*) are used to find a path from the start to the goal.

These approaches require setting a grid resolution. Search is faster with coarser grids, but the algorithm will fail to find paths through narrow portions of C_{free}. Furthermore, the number of points on the grid grows exponentially in the configuration space dimension, which make them inappropriate for high-dimensional problems.

Traditional grid-based approaches produce paths whose heading changes are constrained to multiples of a given base angle, often resulting in suboptimal paths. Any-angle path planning approaches find shorter paths by propagating information along grid edges (to search fast) without constraining their paths to grid edges (to find short paths).

Motion planners can also optimize multiple objectives beyond path length, such as traversal time, energy consumption, or obstacle clearance. For example, multi-objective planners can adapt the relative importance of these objectives to the context of the task and the operating conditions of the robot.

Grid-based approaches often need to search repeatedly, for example, when the knowledge of the robot about the configuration space changes or the configuration space itself changes during path following. Incremental heuristic search algorithms replan fast by using experience with the previous similar path-planning problems to speed up their search for the current one.

=== Interval-based search ===
These approaches are similar to grid-based search approaches except that they generate a paving covering entirely the configuration space instead of a grid. The paving is decomposed into two subpavings X^{−},X^{+} made with boxes such that X^{−} ⊂ C_{free} ⊂ X^{+}. Characterizing C_{free} amounts to solve a set inversion problem. Interval analysis could thus be used when C_{free} cannot be described by linear inequalities in order to have a guaranteed enclosure.

The robot is thus allowed to move freely in X^{−}, and cannot go outside X^{+}. To both subpavings, a neighbor graph is built and paths can be found using algorithms such as Dijkstra or A*. When a path is feasible in X^{−}, it is also feasible in C_{free}. When no path exists in X^{+} from one initial configuration to the goal, we have the guarantee that no feasible path exists in C_{free}. As for the grid-based approach, the interval approach is inappropriate for high-dimensional problems, due to the fact that the number of boxes to be generated grows exponentially with respect to the dimension of configuration space.

An illustration is provided by the three figures on the right where a hook with two degrees of freedom has to move from the left to the right, avoiding two small horizontal segments.

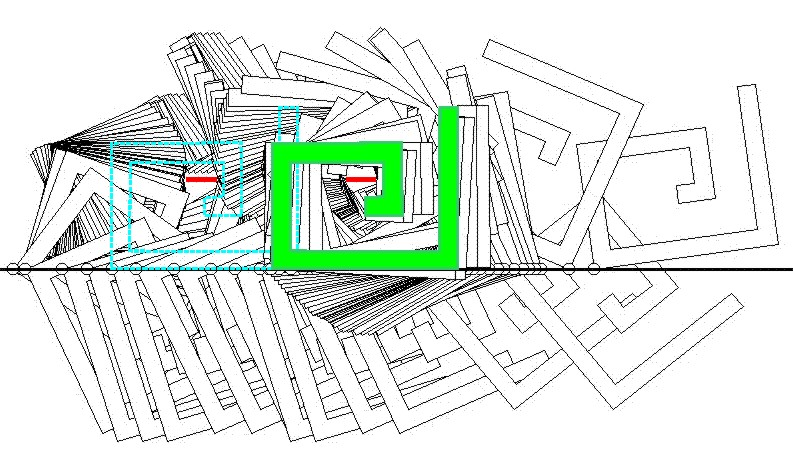
Motion from the initial configuration (blue) to the final configuration of the hook, avoiding the two obstacles (red segments). The left-bottom corner of the hook has to stay on the horizontal line, which makes the hook two degrees of freedom.

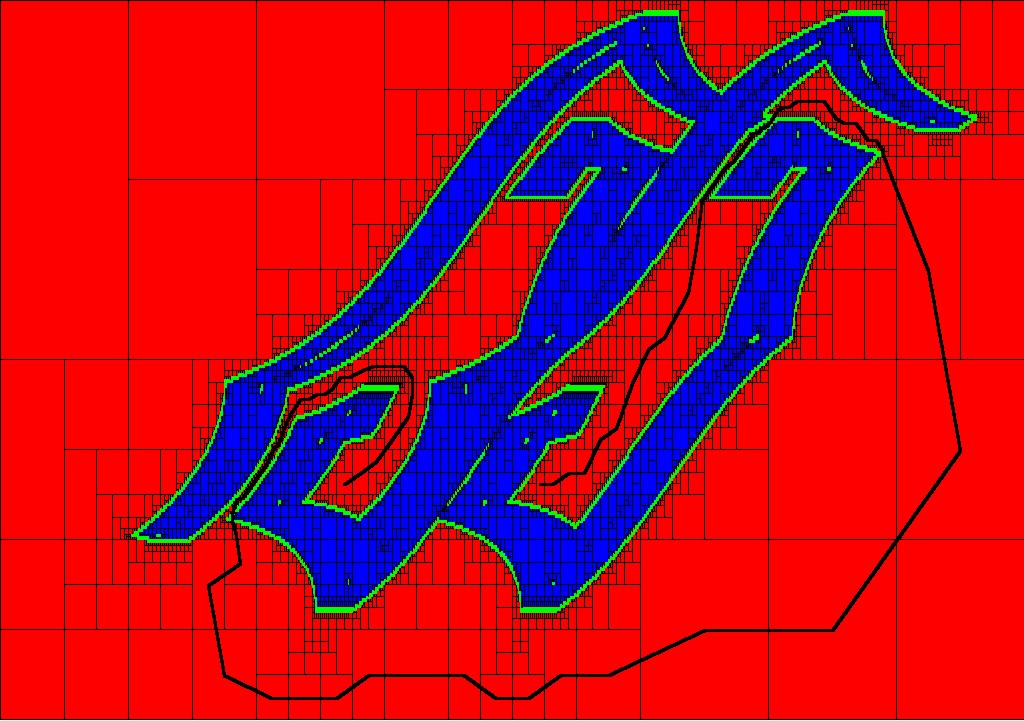
Decomposition with boxes covering the configuration space: The subpaving X^{−} is the union all red boxes and the subpaving X^{+} is the union of red and green boxes. The path corresponds to the motion represented above.

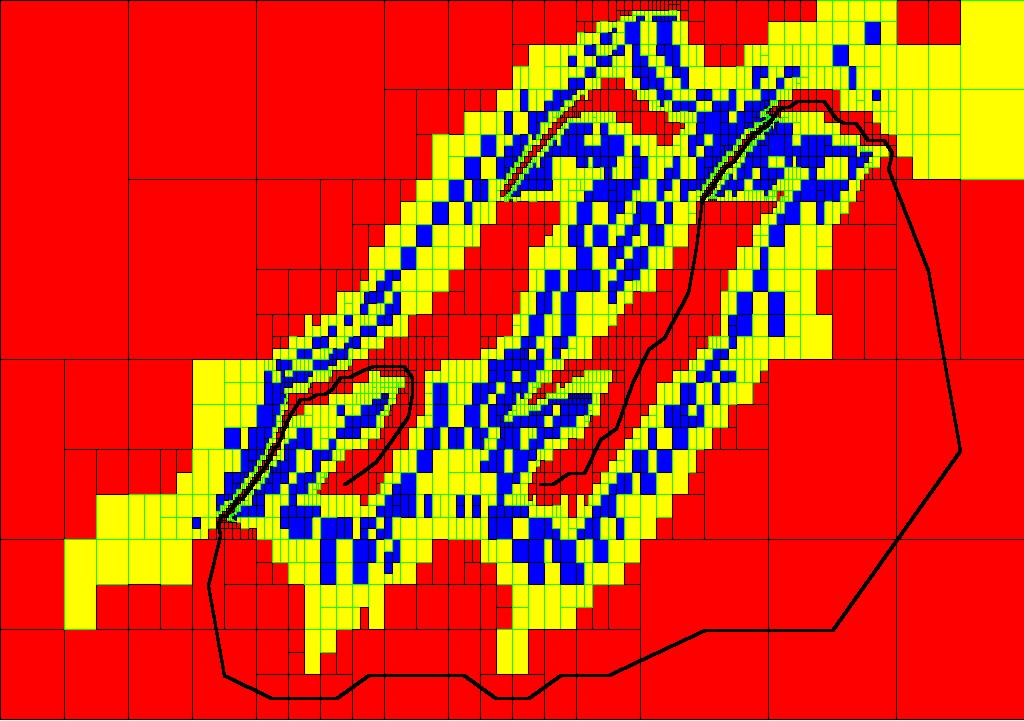
This figure corresponds to the same path as above but obtained with many fewer boxes. The algorithm avoids bisecting boxes in parts of the configuration space that do not influence the final result.

Nicolas Delanoue has shown that the decomposition with subpavings using interval analysis also makes it possible to characterize the topology of C_{free} such as counting its number of connected components.

=== Geometric algorithms ===
Point robots among polygonal obstacles

- Visibility graph
- Cell decomposition
- Voronoi diagram

Translating objects among obstacles

- Minkowski sum

Finding the way out of a building

- farthest ray trace

Given a bundle of rays around the current position attributed with their length hitting a wall, the robot moves into the direction of the longest ray unless a door is identified. Such an algorithm was used for modeling emergency egress from buildings.

=== Artificial potential fields ===
One approach is to treat the robot's configuration as a point in a potential field that combines attraction to the goal, and repulsion from obstacles. The resulting trajectory is output as the path. This approach has advantages in that the trajectory is produced with little computation. However, they can become trapped in local minima of the potential field and fail to find a path, or can find a non-optimal path. The artificial potential fields can be treated as continuum equations similar to electrostatic potential fields (treating the robot like a point charge), or motion through the field can be discretized using a set of linguistic rules. A navigation function or a probabilistic navigation function are sorts of artificial potential functions which have the quality of not having minimum points except the target point.

=== Sampling-based algorithms ===
Sampling-based algorithms represent the configuration space with a roadmap of sampled configurations. A basic algorithm samples N configurations in C, and retains those in C_{free} to use as milestones. A roadmap is then constructed that connects two milestones P and Q if the line segment PQ is completely in C_{free}. Again, collision detection is used to test inclusion in C_{free}. To find a path that connects S and G, they are added to the roadmap. If a path in the roadmap links S and G, the planner succeeds, and returns that path. If not, the reason is not definitive: either there is no path in C_{free}, or the planner did not sample enough milestones.

These algorithms work well for high-dimensional configuration spaces, because unlike combinatorial algorithms, their running time is not (explicitly) exponentially dependent on the dimension of C. They are also (generally) substantially easier to implement. They are probabilistically complete, meaning the probability that they will produce a solution approaches 1 as more time is spent. However, they cannot determine if no solution exists.

Given basic visibility conditions on C_{free}, it has been proven that as the number of configurations N grows higher, the probability that the above algorithm finds a solution approaches 1 exponentially. Visibility is not explicitly dependent on the dimension of C; it is possible to have a high-dimensional space with "good" visibility or a low-dimensional space with "poor" visibility. The experimental success of sample-based methods suggests that most commonly seen spaces have good visibility.

There are many variants of this basic scheme:

- It is typically much faster to only test segments between nearby pairs of milestones, rather than all pairs.
- Nonuniform sampling distributions attempt to place more milestones in areas that improve the connectivity of the roadmap.
- Quasirandom samples typically produce a better covering of configuration space than pseudorandom ones, though some recent work argues that the effect of the source of randomness is minimal compared to the effect of the sampling distribution.
- Employs local-sampling by performing a directional Markov chain Monte Carlo random walk with some local proposal distribution.
- It is possible to substantially reduce the number of milestones needed to solve a given problem by allowing curved eye sights (for example by crawling on the obstacles that block the way between two milestones).
- If only one or a few planning queries are needed, it is not always necessary to construct a roadmap of the entire space. Tree-growing variants are typically faster for this case (single-query planning). Roadmaps are still useful if many queries are to be made on the same space (multi-query planning)

=== List of notable algorithms ===
- A*
- Bug algorithm
- D*
- Dijkstra's algorithm
- Dynamic window approach
- Probabilistic roadmap
- Rapidly-exploring random tree
- Theta*
- Vector Field Histogram

== Motion-planning concepts ==
- Dubins path
- Velocity obstacle
- Visibility graph

== Completeness and performance ==
A motion planner is said to be complete if the planner in finite time either produces a solution or correctly reports that there is none. Most complete algorithms are geometry-based. The performance of a complete planner is assessed by its computational complexity. When proving this property mathematically, one has to make sure, that it happens in finite time and not just in the asymptotic limit. This is especially problematic, if there occur infinite sequences (that converge only in the limiting case) during a specific proving technique, since then, theoretically, the algorithm will never stop. Intuitive "tricks" (often based on induction) are typically mistakenly thought to converge, which they do only for the infinite limit. In other words, the solution exists, but the planner will never report it. This property therefore is related to Turing completeness and serves in most cases as a theoretical underpinning/guidance. Planners based on a brute force approach are always complete, but are only realizable for finite and discrete setups.

In practice, the termination of the algorithm can always be guaranteed by using a counter, that allows only for a maximum number of iterations and then always stops with or without solution. For realtime systems, this is typically achieved by using a watchdog timer, that will simply kill the process. The watchdog has to be independent of all processes (typically realized by low level interrupt routines). The asymptotic case described in the previous paragraph, however, will not be reached in this way. It will report the best one it has found so far (which is better than nothing) or none, but cannot correctly report that there is none. All realizations including a watchdog are always incomplete (except all cases can be evaluated in finite time).

Establishing completeness generally requires a rigorous mathematical proof of correctness, often supported by formal methods, automated tools, or graph-based analysis. In safety-critical applications, such verification is typically performed by specialists with expertise in formal verification and related fields. Conversely, demonstrating that a system is not complete can often be achieved by identifying a single counterexample, such as an infinite loop or an incorrect result. The formal verification and correctness analysis of algorithms is itself an active area of research. Designing appropriate test cases for such evaluations can require substantial technical expertise.

Resolution completeness is the property that the planner is guaranteed to find a path if the resolution of an underlying grid is fine enough. Most resolution complete planners are grid-based or interval-based. The computational complexity of resolution complete planners is dependent on the number of points in the underlying grid, which is O(1/h^{d}), where h is the resolution (the length of one side of a grid cell) and d is the configuration space dimension.

Probabilistic completeness is the property that as more "work" is performed, the probability that the planner fails to find a path, if one exists, asymptotically approaches zero. Several sample-based methods are probabilistically complete. The performance of a probabilistically complete planner is measured by the rate of convergence. For practical applications, one usually uses this property, since it allows setting up the time-out for the watchdog based on an average convergence time.

Incomplete planners do not always produce a feasible path when one exists (see first paragraph). Sometimes incomplete planners do work well in practice since they always stop after a guarantied time and allow other routines to take over.

== Problem variants ==
Many algorithms have been developed to handle variants of this basic problem.

=== Differential constraints ===
Holonomic

- Manipulator arms (with dynamics)

Nonholonomic

- Drones
- Cars
- Unicycles
- Planes
- Acceleration bounded systems
- Moving obstacles (time cannot go backward)
- Bevel-tip steerable needle
- Differential drive robots

=== Hybrid systems ===
Hybrid systems are those that mix discrete and continuous behavior. Examples of such systems are:

- Robotic manipulation
- Mechanical assembly
- Legged robot locomotion
- Reconfigurable robots

=== Uncertainty ===
- Motion uncertainty
- Missing information
- Active sensing
- Sensorless planning
- Networked control systems

=== Environmental constraints ===
- Maps of dynamics

== Applications ==
- Robot navigation
- Automation
- The driverless car
- Robotic surgery
- Digital character animation
- Protein folding
- Safety and accessibility in computer-aided architectural design

== See also ==
- Gimbal lock – Similar traditional issue in mechanical engineering
- Kinodynamic planning – Class of problems
- Mountain climbing problem – Mathematical problem
- List of robotics software
- Moving sofa problem – Mathematical problem of finding the largest two-dimensional shape that can be maneuvered around a corner
- OMPL – The Open Motion Planning Library
- OpenRAVE — testing, developing, and deploying motion planning algorithms in real-world robotics applications.
- Pathfinding – Plotting by a computer application
- Pebble motion problems – Multi-robot motion planning
- Shortest path problem – Computational problem of graph theory
