= List of robotics software =

This is a list of robotics software, including software frameworks, robot software, middleware, computer vision, robotics simulators, motion planning libraries, industrial robot programming tools, robot programming languages, and educational robotics environments.

== Robot operating systems, middleware, frameworks and suites ==
Software	Type	Description
ACROSS Project	Robotics software project	European robotics project for developing reusable software components and integration methods for robot systems.
BrickOS	Embedded robot operating system	Open-source operating system and alternative firmware for Lego Mindstorms RCX robots.
Concurrency and Coordination Runtime	Runtime library	.NET-based runtime used by Microsoft Robotics Developer Studio for coordinating asynchronous and concurrent robotics services.
DialogOS	Dialog system / robotics software	Graphical programming environment for creating spoken-dialog systems, including applications in human–robot interaction.
Harmony	Real-time research operating system	Experimental real-time operating system developed at the National Research Council Canada and used in robotics research.
Microsoft Robotics Developer Studio	Robotics development environment	Discontinued Windows-based environment for robot control and simulation, aimed at academic, hobbyist, and commercial developers.
MIRA	Middleware / robotics framework	Cross-platform C++ framework providing middleware, base functionalities, and tools for developing and testing robotic applications.
MRPT	Robotics library / suite	Open-source C++ toolkit with applications and libraries for common robotics research areas, including mapping, localization, SLAM, and navigation.
NVIDIA Isaac ROS	ROS 2 package collection	Collection of NVIDIA-accelerated ROS 2 packages for robotics applications, including GPU-accelerated robotics and vision components.
OpenRTM-aist	RT middleware implementation	Software platform developed on the basis of the RT middleware standard.
Orocos	Robot control framework	Open Robot Control Software project providing portable C++ libraries for advanced machine and robot control.
Player Project	Robot device interface and simulation framework	Free and open-source robotics software project that includes the Player robot device server and the Stage simulator.
Python Robotics	Robotics algorithms collection	Open-source Python collection of robotics algorithms, including examples for localization, mapping, path planning, path tracking, and control.
ROS	Robotics middleware / software framework	Open-source set of software libraries and tools for building robot applications.
RT middleware	Middleware standard	Robotics Technology Middleware platform for constructing robot systems from networked software components.
Turing OS	Robot operating system	Artificial-intelligence robot operating system developed by Turing Robot for multimodal human–robot interaction.
URBI	Robotics software platform	Cross-platform software platform and scripting language for robotics and complex systems.
VxWorks	Real-time operating system	Real-time operating system with build support for running selected ROS 2 packages on VxWorks 7.
YARP	Middleware	Library and toolkit for robot communication and device interfaces, used in systems ranging from humanoid robots to embedded devices.

== Simulation software ==
Software	Type	Description
AirSim	Autonomous-vehicle and robotics simulator	Open-source simulator for drones, cars, and other autonomous systems, originally developed by Microsoft Research.
AnimatLab	Neuromechanical and robotics simulator	Free 3D neuromechanical simulation software for building biologically inspired virtual organisms and robots.
AnyKode Marilou	Robot simulator	Modeling and simulation environment for mobile robots, humanoids, articulated arms, and parallel robots.
ARGoS	Swarm robotics simulator	Multi-physics simulator designed for large-scale robot swarm simulation.
Asynchronous multi-body framework	Robot simulator	Open-source framework for real-time dynamic simulation of robots, multi-body systems, soft bodies, and haptic interaction.
CoppeliaSim	Robot simulator	Robot simulation platform used for algorithm development, factory automation simulation, prototyping, education, and digital twins.
Gazebo	Robot simulator	Open-source robotics simulator with physics, rendering, sensor models, plugins, a graphical interface, and message-passing interfaces.
MuJoCo	Physics engine / robot simulation	Free and open-source physics engine used for robotics, biomechanics, graphics, animation, and machine learning research.
NVIDIA Isaac Sim	Robotics simulator	Robotics simulation platform built on NVIDIA Omniverse for robot simulation, testing, and synthetic data generation.
PyBullet	Physics simulation Python module	Python module based on the Bullet Physics SDK for physics simulation, robotics, and reinforcement-learning applications.
RoboDK	Industrial robot simulator / offline programming software	Software for simulating and programming robot arms offline for manufacturing and automation.
RoboLogix	Industrial robot simulator	Robotics simulation software package used to teach, test, run, and debug industrial robot programs in simulated manufacturing applications.
Robotics Toolbox for MATLAB	Robotics simulation and analysis toolbox	MATLAB toolbox for analyzing and simulating mobile robots and robot manipulators.
Simbad robot simulator	Robot simulator	Open-source Java 3D robot simulator for scientific and educational applications in autonomous robotics and artificial intelligence.
SimSpark	Multiagent simulation system	Generic simulator for multiagent physical simulations used in AI and robotics research.
Visual Components	Manufacturing and robot simulation software	Manufacturing simulation and offline robot programming software for industrial automation workflows.
Webots	Robot simulator	Open-source, multi-platform desktop application for modeling, programming, and simulating robots.

== Motion planning, modeling, and control ==
Software	Type	Description
Drake	Robot modeling and control toolbox	C++ toolbox for analyzing robot dynamics and building control systems, with an emphasis on optimization-based design and analysis.
MoveIt	Motion-planning and manipulation framework	Motion planning, manipulation, and kinematics framework for ROS.
OMPL	Motion-planning library	Open Motion Planning Library, a software package for motion planning using sampling-based algorithms.
OpenRAVE	Motion-planning and simulation framework	Framework for testing, developing, and deploying motion planning algorithms in real-world robotics applications.
Orocos KDL	Kinematics and dynamics library	C++ library from the Orocos project for modeling kinematic chains and computing forward and inverse kinematics and dynamics.

== Computer vision ==
Software	Type	Description
AForge.NET	Computer vision framework	C# framework for computer vision, artificial intelligence, image processing, machine learning, and robotics-related applications.
Dlib	Machine learning and computer vision library	Cross-platform C++ library with machine-learning and image-processing tools used in robotics, embedded devices, and other real-world software applications.
OpenCV	Computer vision library	Open-source computer vision and machine learning software library used in robotics for image processing, object detection, camera calibration, visual tracking, and robot perception.
Point Cloud Library	Point cloud processing library	Open-source C++ library for processing 2D and 3D images and point clouds.
SwisTrack	Vision tracking software	Open-source video tracking software for tracking robots and other objects from camera or recorded video input.
Tesseract	Optical character recognition engine	Open-source optical character recognition engine used for extracting text from images and scanned documents, including computer-vision and image-processing workflows.

== Autonomous vehicles and drones ==
Software	Type	Description
ArduPilot	Autonomous vehicle control software	Open-source autopilot software for controlling unmanned aerial vehicles, ground vehicles, boats, submarines, and other autonomous systems.
LibrePilot	UAV flight-control software	Open-source flight-control software for vehicle stabilization, unmanned autonomous vehicles, and robotics applications.
Openpilot	Driver-assistance software	Open-source driver-assistance software developed by comma.ai for supported road vehicles, providing functions including adaptive cruise control and automated lane centering.
Paparazzi Project	UAV autopilot software	Free and open-source hardware and software project for autonomous fixed-wing aircraft, rotorcraft, hybrid aircraft, and other unmanned vehicles.
PX4 autopilot	UAV flight-control software	Open-source flight-control software for drones and other unmanned vehicles, including multicopters, fixed-wing aircraft, VTOL aircraft, and ground vehicles.

== Robot programming languages ==
Language	Type	Description
A Manufacturing Language	Industrial robot programming language	Robot programming language developed by IBM for its RS 1 robot and Robot Manufacturing System product line.
Enchanting	Educational robot programming language	Free and open-source Scratch-like programming language for programming Lego Mindstorms NXT robots.
EusLisp	Robot programming language	Lisp-based object-oriented programming system designed for robotics research and intelligent robot development.
GOLOG	Logic programming language	High-level logic programming language for specifying and executing complex actions in dynamic domains, including autonomous-agent and robot-control applications.
KUKA Robot Language	Industrial robot programming language	Programming language used for programming KUKA industrial robot controllers.
leJOS	Educational robotics firmware and programming environment	Java-based replacement firmware and programming environment for Lego Mindstorms programmable bricks.
Microsoft Visual Programming Language	Visual robot programming language	Visual dataflow programming language included with Microsoft Robotics Developer Studio for building robotics applications.
PLEXIL	Plan-execution language	Plan Execution Interchange Language, a programming language and execution system for automating plans on real or simulated systems.
RAPID	Industrial robot programming language	Programming language used for ABB industrial robots and RobotWare controllers.
Urbiscript	Robot scripting language	Parallel and event-driven scripting language used with the Urbi robotics platform.
URScript	Robot programming language	Programming language developed by Universal Robots for controlling Universal Robots robot arms.
Variable Assembly Language	Industrial robot programming language	Early robot programming language associated with Unimation industrial robots.
WSFN	Robot control language	Small interpreted programming language for controlling robots, created by Li-Chen Wang and later adapted for turtle graphics.

== Industrial control and PLC software ==
Name	Type	Description
CODESYS	PLC programming environment	Software used to program industrial controllers, including robotics-related automation systems and ROS-connected robot workflows.
TIA Portal	PLC and automation engineering software	Siemens automation engineering software used in industrial robotics workflows, including robot integration through the Simatic Robot Library.
TwinCAT	PLC, motion-control and robotics software	Automation software used for PC-based control, including robotics, motion control and PLC applications.

== Educational and Lego robotics software ==
Software	Type	Description
Actor-Lab	Educational robot programming environment	Programming environment associated with Lego Mindstorms and educational robotics.
Bricx Command Center	Lego Mindstorms programming environment	Integrated development environment for programming Lego Mindstorms RCX, Scout, Spybotics, NXT, and EV3 robots.
Lego Mindstorms	Educational robotics software and hardware ecosystem	Discontinued line of educational kits for building programmable robots based on Lego bricks.
Lego Mindstorms EV3	Educational robotics platform	Third-generation Lego Mindstorms robotics kit and programming platform.
Lego Mindstorms NXT	Educational robotics platform	Second-generation Lego Mindstorms robotics kit and programming platform.
Open Roberta	Educational robot programming environment	Open-source graphical programming environment for programming robots and microcontrollers in educational contexts.
QDriverStation	Driver-station software	Free and open-source driver-station software for FIRST Robotics Competition robots, developed as an alternative to the official FRC Driver Station.
RoboBlockly	Educational robot simulation environment	Web-based Blockly-style robot simulation environment for learning coding, robotics, mathematics, science, and art.
RoboMind	Educational programming environment	Educational programming environment based around controlling a virtual robot.

== See also ==
- Artificial intelligence software
- Autonomous robot
- List of artificial intelligence algorithms
- List of artificial intelligence journals
- List of open-source robotics software
- List of roboticists
- List of robotics companies
- List of robotics journals
- List of robotics occupations
- Lists of open-source artificial intelligence software
- List of open-source robotics hardware
- Off-line programming (robotics)
- Open-source robotics
- Robotics middleware
- Robotics
- Robot learning
- Swarm robotic platforms
- Ubiquitous robot
- URDF — XML-based format used to describe robot models, especially in ROS-related tools such as RViz and Gazebo.
