= AML =

AML may refer to:

== Companies, organizations, associations ==
- Academia Mexicana de la Lengua, or Mexican Academy of Language, a national academy in Mexico responsible for regulating the Spanish language
- Africa Morocco Link, a ferry company
- Association for Mormon Letters, established for the promotion and criticism of Mormon writing
- Association of Muslim Lawyers (UK)
- Australian Institute for Machine Learning, at Lot Fourteen, Adelaide
- American Merchant Lines, a former transatlantic shipping company

== Computers and telecommunications ==
- A Manufacturing Language (AML, AML/2, AML/V, AML/X), an IBM robot programming language and its derivatives
- ACPI Machine Language, a specialized programming language that forms part of the Advanced Configuration and Power Interface
- Additional Military Layers, a military standard of exchanging authoritative maritime geospatial information data, covered by STANAG 7170
- Advanced Mobile Location, a geolocation system on smartphones that facilitates emergency services
- Algebraic modeling language, programming languages for describing and solving problems of high complexity
- ARC Macro Language, a high-level algorithmic language for the ArcInfo Geographic Information System
- Automated machine learning (AutoML), the process of automating the end-to-end process of applying machine learning to real-world problems
- Microsoft Assistance Markup Language, an XML-based markup language

== Medicine ==
- Acute myeloid leukemia, a form of cancer
- Angiomyolipoma, a benign type of kidney tumour

== Transport ==
- Acton Main Line railway station, England
- Aston Martin Lagonda Limited, English automaker
- Panhard AML, French armoured car of Cold War era

== Other uses ==
- Anti–money laundering, an umbrella term for regulations that aim to prevent money-laundering
- Anti Monopoly Law of China
- Abandoned mine lands
- Awaken, My Love!, the third studio album by Childish Gambino
