= KRL =

KRL may refer to:

- KRL (programming language), Knowledge Representation Language
- Karelian language, ISO 639 code
- Kereta Rel Listrik, an Indonesian term for electric multiple unit and commuter rail systems in Indonesia:
  - KRL Commuterline, Greater Jakarta
  - KRL Commuterline Yogyakarta–Solo, Greater Yogyakarta and Surakarta
- Khan Research Laboratories, a national laboratory in Pakistan
- Kinetic Rule Language, a rules-based event programming language
- IATA code for Korla Airport, China
- Kuka Robot Language, language used for programming KUKA robots
- Kitsap Regional Library, a library system in Kitsap County, Washington.
