= Tailent Automation Platform =

Romanian automation software company

Tailent
- Type: Private
- Industry: Robotic Process Automation, Artificial Intelligence, Automation
- Founded: 2015 in Bucharest, Romania
- Founders: Mario Popescu; Cristian Oftez
- Headquarters: Bucharest, Romania
- Area served: Worldwide
- Products: TAP Studio; TAP Robots; TAP Assistant; TAP Orchestrator
- Website: tailent.com

Tailent is a Romanian software company that develops robotic process automation (RPA) software. The company was founded by Mario Popescu and Cristian Oftez and is headquartered in Bucharest. Its software automates repetitive, rule-based business tasks. In 2020, Tailent was named among the 40 startups in Startup Spotlight Online.

== History ==
Tailent was founded in 2015 in Bucharest, Romania as Mission Critical, by Mario Popescu and Cristian Oftez. The company was renamed Tailent in 2020, the same year it launched the Tailent Automation Platform (TAP), and with entering the international market.

== Products ==
Tailent develops software that is used to automate repetitive tasks, normally performed by people. The technology combines how humans read the computer displays with prebuilt components that can be combined to automate specific processes. This type of software can be used to automate any tasks performed by other business software such as CRM or ERP, or it can be used to simplify front office repetitive tasks.

Tailent's main product is Tailent Automation Platform (TAP). It combines a low-code Integrated Development Environment (IDE) called Studio, used for process creation with agents called Robots to execute the processes. Everything is managed and monitored in a management tool called Orchestrator.
