= Player Project =

Robot interface specification and software system

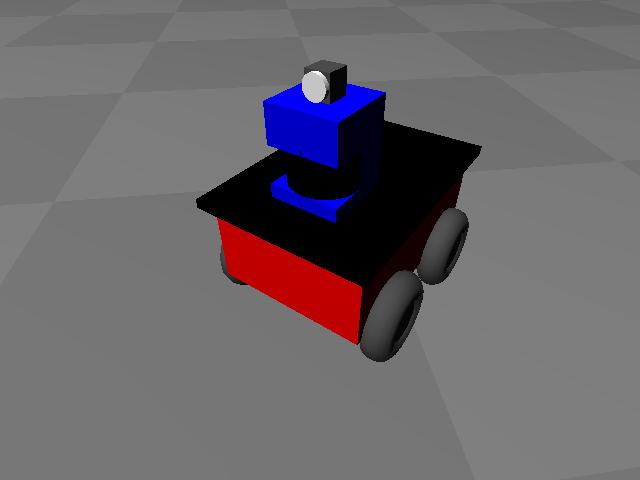
- Pioneer 3-AT robot in a Gazebo 3D simulation environment
- Developers: Brian Gerkey, Richard Vaughan, Andrew Howard, Nathan Koenig
- Initial release: 2000; 26 years ago
- Stable release: 3.0.2 / June 28, 2010; 15 years ago
- Operating system: Linux, Solaris, BSD, macOS
- Type: Robotics suite
- License: GNU General Public License
- Website: playerstage.sourceforge.net

The Player Project (formerly Player/Stage Project) creates free and open-source software for research into robotics and sensor systems. Its components include the Player network server and the Stage platform robotics simulators. Although accurate statistics are hard to obtain, Player is one of the most popular open-source robot interfaces in research and post-secondary education.

== Overview ==
The Player Project is an umbrella under which two robotics-related software projects are currently developed. These include the Player networked robotics server, and the Stage 2D robot simulation environment. The project was founded in 2000 by Brian Gerkey, Richard Vaughan and Andrew Howard at the University of Southern California at Los Angeles, and is widely used in robotics research and education. It releases its software under the GNU General Public License with documentation under the GNU Free Documentation License.

The Player is set of application programming interfaces (APIs, e.g., position2d, bumper, ir, speech, power) that can be implemented by a robot chassis (Roomba, Khephera, etc.), or over serial line or network, or by Stage (2D simulator) or Gazebo (3D simulator).

=== Gazebo ===
The Gazebo 3D robot simulator was a component in the Player Project from 2004 through 2011. Gazebo integrated the Open Dynamics Engine (ODE) physics engine, OpenGL rendering, and support code for sensor simulation and actuator control. In 2011, Gazebo became an independent project support by Willow Garage.

== Supported robots ==
- Acroname's Garcia
- Botrics's Obot d100
- CoroWare Inc. Corobot and Explorer
- Evolution Robotics' ER1 and ERSDK robots
- iRobot's Roomba vacuuming robot
- K-Team's Robotics Extension Board (REB) attached to Kameleon 376BC
- K-Team's Khephera
- MobileRobots' (formerly ActivMedia) PSOS/P2OS/AROS-based robots
- Nomadics' NOMAD200 (and possibly related) mobile robots
- RWI/iRobot's RFLEX-based robots (e.g., B21r, ATRV Jr)
- Segway's Robotic Mobility Platform (RMP)
- UPenn GRASP's Clodbuster
- Videre Design's ERRATIC mobile robot platform
- White Box Robotics' 914 PC-BOT

== See also ==
- List of robotics software
- Simbad robot simulator
- Microsoft Robotics Studio
- Webots
- URBI
- Turtle (robot)
- Mobile Robot Programming Toolkit
- Robot Operating System (ROS)
