= Chief automation officer =

Corporate executive overseeing automation

The chief automation officer (CAO) is the manager overseeing an enterprises's digital automation and robotic process automation strategy.

The position came to prominence following the growth of artificial intelligence.

A chief automation officer may establish an "Automation Center of Excellence" (ACoE) to codify best practices within the organization.
