= ATOS =

Japanese railway control system

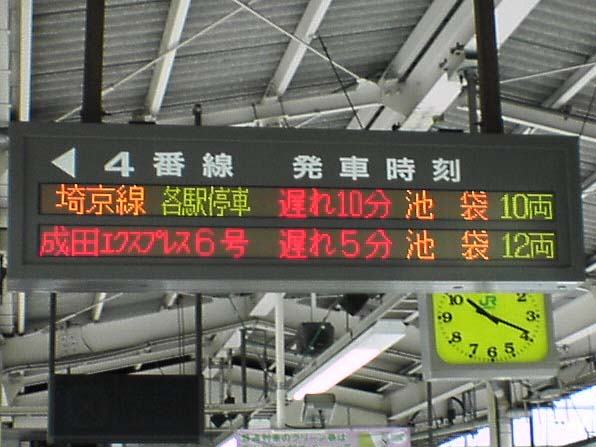
An electronic display at Shinjuku station showing train delay information from ATOS

Autonomous Decentralized Transport Operation Control System (東京圏輸送管理システム, Tōkyō Ken Yusō Kanri Shisutemu) or ATOS (アトス, Atosu) is a computerized control system used by the East Japan Railway Company to regulate train traffic on railway lines in metropolitan Tokyo, Japan. It was designed by Hitachi. The first deployment was on the Chūō Main Line in 1996. It is now used on fourteen lines listed below.

On ATOS-enabled lines, each train station has electronic displays, which show scheduled arrival times and train destinations in Japanese and English, warn passengers when trains are arriving or passing through, send updates on system delays and accidents, and display messages to advertise JR products or warn passengers not to smoke. Pre-recorded voice announcements in train stations are also automated by ATOS.

ATOS also directs train drivers through 16-by-16 lamp matrices, which flash messages telling the train driver to speed up, slow down, or adjust their scheduled departure time in order to keep the entire network running on schedule.

Several JR lines in the Kantō region use CTC or PRC systems in lieu of ATOS.

== ATOS-enabled lines ==
- Chūō Main Line in metro Tokyo (March 1997)
- Yamanote Line (August 1998)
- Keihin-Tohoku Line (August 1998)
- Sobu Line (Rapid and Local) west of Chiba (June 1999)
- Yokosuka Line north of Ofuna (July 2000)
- Tōkaidō Main Line (Passenger and freight) (September 2001)
- Joban Line (Rapid and Local) (January 2004)
- Tohoku Main Line (December 2004)
- Takasaki Line (December 2004)
- Saikyo Line (July 2005)
- Kawagoe Line (July 2005)
- Yamanote Freight Line (July 2005)
- Nambu Line (March 2006)
- Tohoku Freight Line (December 2004)
- Yokosuka Line (Ofuna - Kurihama) (November 2009)
- Musashino Line (January 2012)
- Yokohama Line (July 2015)
- Keiyō Line (September 2016)
- Ōme Line (December 2016)
- Itsukaichi Line (December 2016)

== See also ==
- Autonomous decentralized system
