= Peter Corke =

Australian roboticist

Peter I. Corke
- Born: 24 August 1959 (age 67); Melbourne
- Education: University of Melbourne
- Known for: Vision-based robot control, Field robotics
- Father: David Corke
- Relatives: Fiona Corke (sister)
- Awards: IEEE Fellow, Fellow of Australian Academy of Technological Sciences and Engineering, Senior Fellow of the Higher Education Academy
- Scientific career
- Fields: Robotics; Computer Vision
- Workplaces: Queensland University of Technology; CSIRO; University of Melbourne
- Thesis: High-performance visual closed-loop robot control (1994)
- Doctoral advisor: M.C. Good
- Website: petercorke.com

Peter Corke FAA (born 24 August 1959) is an Australian roboticist known for his work on Visual Servoing, field robotics, online education, the online Robot Academy and the Robotics Toolbox and Machine Vision Toolbox for MATLAB (matrix laboratory). He was the director of the Australian Research Council Centre of Excellence for Robotic Vision, and currently is a Distinguished Emeritus Professor at Queensland University of Technology. His research is concerned with robotic vision, flying robots and farming robots.

Corke is a Fellow of the Australian Academy of Technological Sciences and Engineering and of the Institute of Electrical and Electronics Engineers. He is a founding editor of the Journal of Field Robotics, and a former member of the executive editorial board of The International Journal of Robotics Research.

== Career ==
Corke received Bachelor of Engineering, Masters of Engineering and Ph.D. degrees from the University of Melbourne in Australia.

In 1984 he worked at CSIRO, formerly the Commonwealth Scientific and Industrial Research Organisation, on robotics. He developed an open-source robot control system and vision applications in food processing and for real-time traffic monitoring.

In 1995 he moved to Brisbane and established a program of research into mining automation focused on Dragline excavators, rope shovels and load-haul-dump (load-haul-dump) units. In 1996, Corke co-authored an early tutorial paper and later proposed the partitioned approach to visual control. He served as Research Director of the Autonomous Systems Laboratory of CSIRO's Information and Communications Technology Centre (ICTC), from 2004 to 2007.

From 2005 to 2009 he worked on wireless sensor network technology, was a co-developer of the Fleck wireless sensor node, and investigated applications to environmental monitoring and agriculture, and virtual fencing. He was a senior principal research scientist when he left to take up a chair at the Queensland University of Technology in 2010.

From 2009 to 2013, he served as editor-in-chief of IEEE Robotics & Automation Magazine.

He is currently the Chief Roboticist at Lyro Robotics.

== Works ==
- Robotics, Vision & Control (2nd ed.). Springer. 2017. ISBN 978-3-319-54412-0.
- Robotics, Vision & Control. Springer. 2011. ISBN 978-3-642-20143-1.
- Visual Control of Robots: High-Performance visual servoing. Research Studies Press (John Wiley). 1996. ISBN 978-0-86380-207-2.
- "Robotics Toolbox for MATLAB".
- "Machine Vision Toolbox for MATLAB".
