= Microsoft Visual Programming Language =

Visual programming language

Visual Programming Language (VPL)
- Paradigm: Visual programming, dataflow programming
- Developer: Microsoft
- Filename extensions: .mvpl
- Website: docs.microsoft.com/en-us/previous-versions/microsoft-robotics/bb483088(v=msdn.10)

Microsoft Visual Programming Language, or VPL, is a visual programming and dataflow programming language developed by Microsoft for the Microsoft Robotics Studio. VPL is based on the event-driven and data-driven approach. The programming language is distinguished from other Microsoft programming languages such as Visual Basic and C#, as it is the only Microsoft language that is a true visual programming language. Microsoft has utilized the term "Visual" in its previous programming products to reflect that a large degree of development in these languages can be performed by "dragging and dropping" in a traditional wysiwyg fashion.

== See also ==
- Dataflow programming
- List of robotics software
- Visual programming languages
- Microsoft Robotics Developer Studio
- VIPLE: Visual IoT/Robotics Programming Language Environment
