= RAPID =

High-level programming language used to control ABB industrial robots

- Designed by: ABB Group
- Developer: ABB Group
- First appeared: 1994

Influenced by
- ARLA, C

RAPID is a high-level programming language used to control ABB industrial robots. RAPID was introduced along with the S4 Control System in 1994 by ABB, superseding the ARLA programming language.

Features in the language include:

- Routine parameters:
  - Procedures - used as a subprogram.
  - Functions - return a value of a specific type and are used as an argument of an instruction.
  - Trap routines - a means of responding to interrupts.
- Arithmetic and logical expressions
- Automatic error handling
- Modular programs
- Multi tasking

== See also ==
- KUKA Robot Language
- G-code
- List of robotics software
