= MetraLabs GmbH =

German robotics company

MetraLabs
- Company type: GmbH
- Industry: Service Robotics
- Founded: 2001
- Headquarters: Weimarer Str. 28, 98693 Ilmenau, Germany
- Area served: Europe
- Products: SCITOS G5, SCITOS A5, CogniDrive
- Website: http://www.metralabs.com

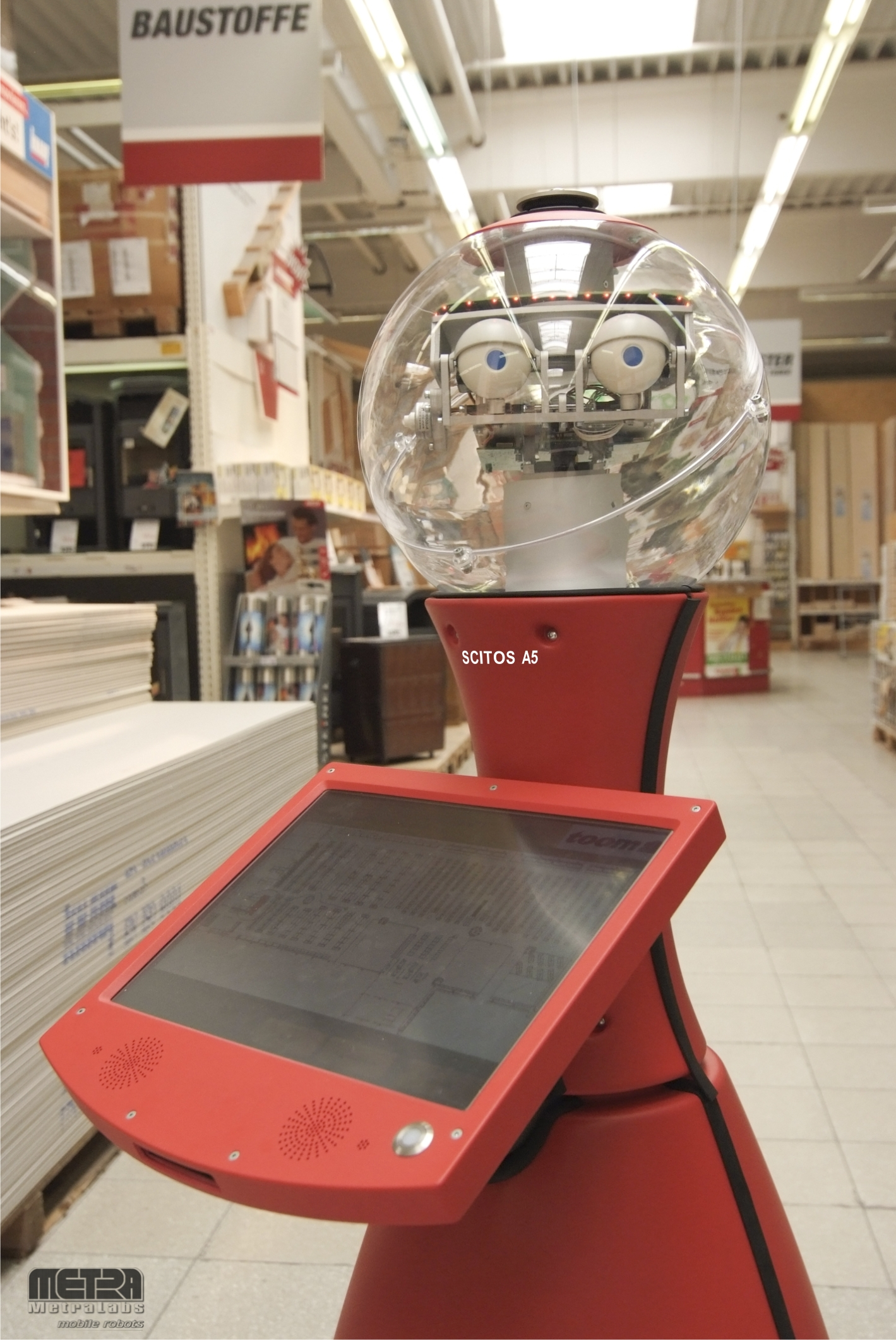
A SCITOS A5 robot working in a hardware store.

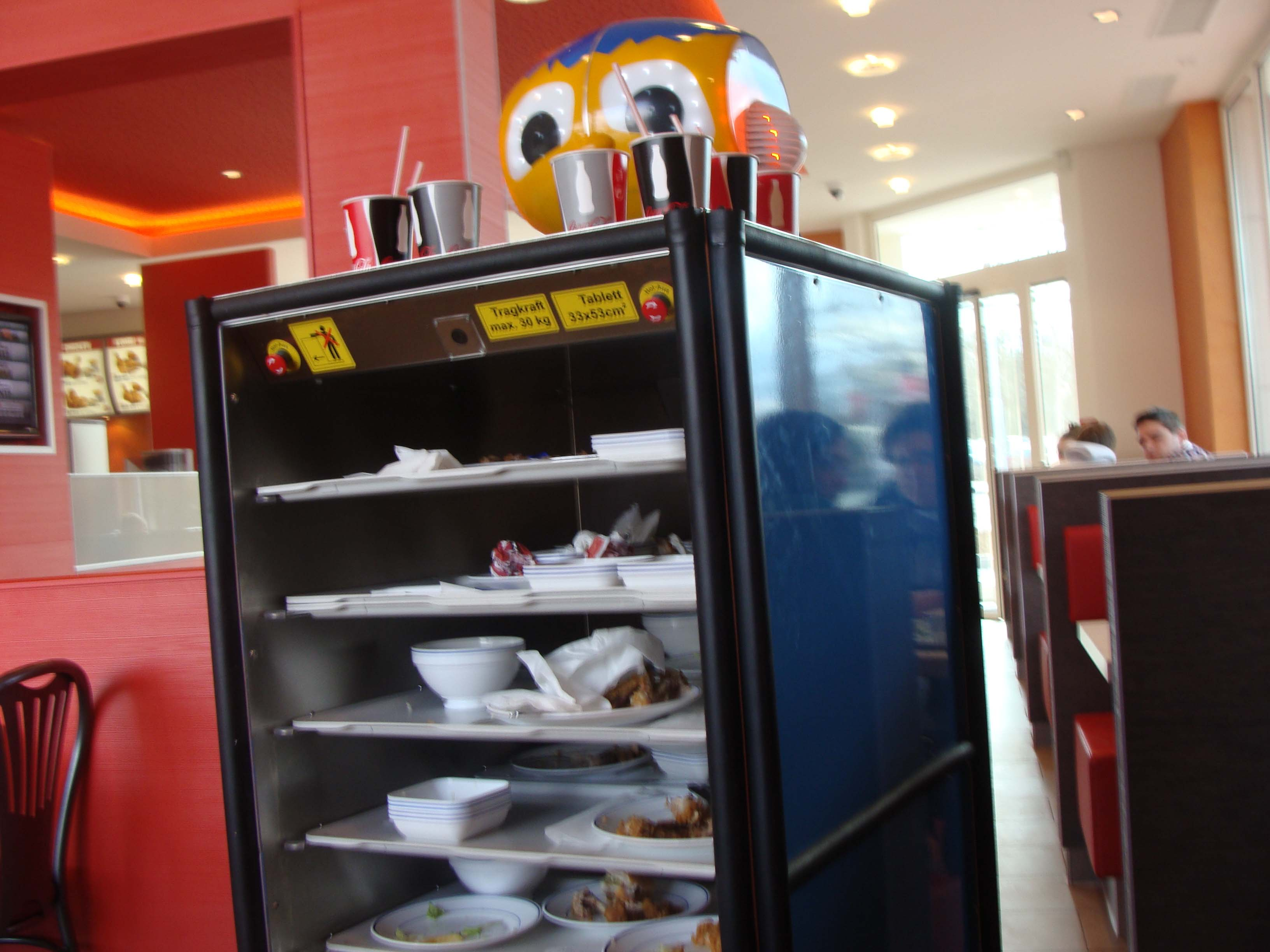
A tray transporting robot working in a KFC franchise in Germany.

MetraLabs GmbH is a German robotics company, specializing in the development and production of service robots for industrial, commercial, and retail markets. MetraLabs was founded by graduates of the Ilmenau University of Technology and has a connection with the University Neuroinformatics and Cognitive Robotics Lab, headed by Professor Groß. Together, they have worked on multiple projects, including the development of a senior citizen assistant robot.

MetraLabs is one of the developers of Middleware for Robotic Applications, which is a cross-platform, open-source software framework for robotic applications.

== Awards ==
- Two of its robots, designed for Infineon Technologies, received the "it-innovation prize" in 2010.
- Published in the Gartner "Cool Vendors in Retail 2010".
- Winner in the "Digital & Media" category of the XXII Innovation Award Thuringia 2019.
