= RT middleware =

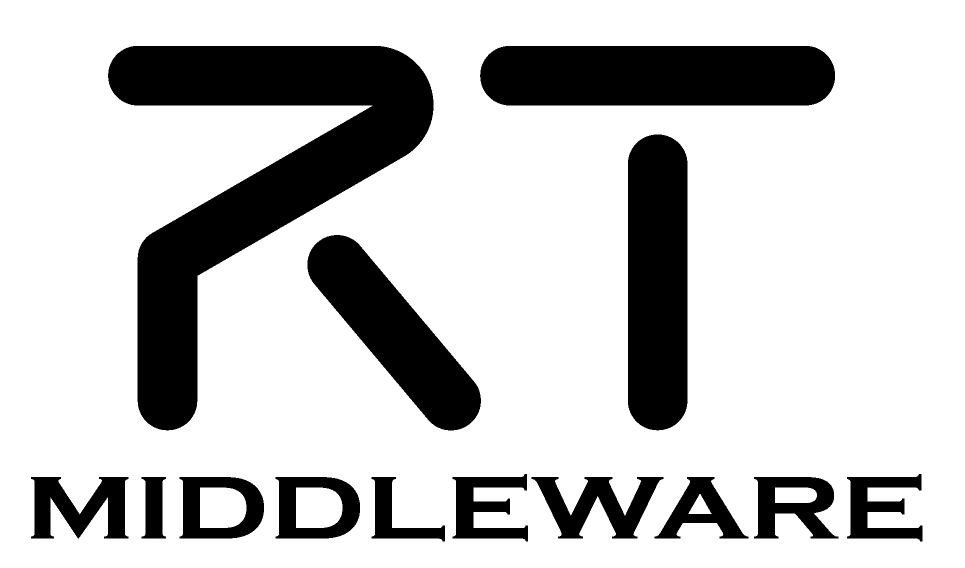
Logo mark; Japan Robot Association

RT-middleware (Robotics Technology Middleware) is a common computing platform technical standard for robots based on distributed object technology. RT-middleware supports the construction of various networked robotic systems by integrating various network-enabled robotic elements named RT-Components, which specification standard is discussed and defined by the Object Management Group (OMG).

== Properties ==
In the RT-middleware, robotics elements, such as actuators, are regarded as RT-components, and the whole robotic system is constructed by connecting such components. This distributed architecture helps developers reuse the robotic elements and boosts the reliability of a system.

Each RT-component has a port as an endpoint for communicating to other RT-components. Every port has its type and the ports which have the same type can be connected each other.

RT-components also have state, so they behave as finite-state machines. The states they can have are: CREATED, INACTIVE, ACTIVE, and ERROR. States and behaviors are controlled by the execution-context. If component behavior must be changed, the execution-context can be replaced at runtime.

== Implementations ==
RT-middleware is only a standard of the Robotics platform software. Implementations include:

- OpenRTM-aist is based on the Common Object Request Broker Architecture (CORBA) platform developed by National Institute of Advanced Industrial Science and Technology. Using CORBA properties, OpenRTM-aist is available for environments with multiple platforms and programming languages.
- OpenRTM.NET is for the .NET Framework.
- RTM on Android is being implemented on Android (operating system).
- RTC Lite is a future modified RT-middleware for embedded or small-resource systems.
- RTM Safety to pass the IEC 61508 standard.

== Related projects ==
- Robot Operating System (ROS) – C++ software framework developed by Willow Garage.
- Open Robot Control Software (Orocos) – C++ software framework for component-based robot control software
- OPRoS developed by Korea Association of Robot Industry (KAR)

== See also ==
- Robot
- Open-source robotics
- List of robotics software
- Middleware
- New Energy and Industrial Technology Development Organization
- National Institute of Advanced Industrial Science and Technology
- Object Management Group
- Japan Robot Association
