= EusLisp Robot Programming Language =

EusLisp is a Lisp-based programming system. Built on the basis of object orientation, it is designed specifically for developing robotics software. The first version of it ran in 1986 on Unix-System5/Ustation-E20.

== See also ==
- List of robotics software
