= Blackboard system =

Type of artificial intelligence approach

A blackboard system is an artificial intelligence approach based on the blackboard architectural model, where a common knowledge base, the "blackboard", is iteratively updated by a diverse group of specialist knowledge sources, starting with a problem specification and ending with a solution. Each knowledge source updates the blackboard with a partial solution when its internal constraints match the blackboard state. In this way, the specialists work together to solve the problem. The blackboard model was originally designed as a way to handle complex, ill-defined problems, where the solution is the sum of its parts.

== Metaphor ==
The following scenario provides a simple metaphor that gives some insight into how a blackboard functions:

A group of specialists are seated in a room with a large blackboard. They work as a team to brainstorm a solution to a problem, using the blackboard as the workplace for cooperatively developing the solution.

The session begins when the problem specifications are written onto the blackboard. The specialists all watch the blackboard, looking for an opportunity to apply their expertise to the developing solution. When someone writes something on the blackboard that allows another specialist to apply their expertise, the second specialist records their contribution on the blackboard, hopefully enabling other specialists to then apply their expertise. This process of adding contributions to the blackboard continues until the problem has been solved.

== Components ==
A blackboard-system application consists of three major components

1. The software specialist modules, which are called knowledge sources (KSs). Like the human experts at a blackboard, each knowledge source provides specific expertise needed by the application.
2. The blackboard, a shared repository of problems, partial solutions, suggestions, and contributed information. The blackboard can be thought of as a dynamic "library" of contributions to the current problem that have been recently "published" by other knowledge sources.
3. The control shell, which controls the flow of problem-solving activity in the system. Just as the eager human specialists need a moderator to prevent them from trampling each other in a mad dash to grab the chalk, KSs need a mechanism to organize their use in the most effective and coherent fashion. In a blackboard system, this is provided by the control shell.

=== Learnable Task Modeling Language ===
A blackboard system is the central space in a multi-agent system. It's used for describing the world as a communication platform for agents. To realize a blackboard in a computer program, a machine readable notation is needed in which facts can be stored. One attempt in doing so is a SQL database, another option is the Learnable Task Modeling Language (LTML). The syntax of the LTML planning language is similar to PDDL, but adds extra features like control structures and OWL-S models. LTML was developed in 2007 as part of a much larger project called POIROT (Plan Order Induction by Reasoning from One Trial), which is a Learning from demonstrations framework for process mining. In POIROT, Plan traces and hypotheses are stored in the LTML syntax for creating semantic web services.

Here is a small example: A human user is executing a workflow in a computer game. The user presses some buttons and interacts with the game engine. While the user interacts with the game, a plan trace is created. That means the user's actions are stored in a logfile. The logfile gets transformed into a machine readable notation which is enriched by semantic attributes. The result is a textfile in the LTML syntax which is put on the blackboard. Agents (software programs in the blackboard system) are able to parse the LTML syntax.

== Implementations ==
We first examine two foundational blackboard systems—BB1 and GBB—before exploring contemporary implementations and their applications.

The BB1 blackboard architecture was originally inspired by studies of how humans plan to perform multiple tasks in a trip, used task-planning as a simplified example of tactical planning for the Office of Naval Research. Hayes-Roth & Hayes-Roth found that human planning was more closely modeled as an opportunistic process, in contrast to the primarily top-down planners used at the time:

While not incompatible with successive-refinement models, our view of planning is somewhat different. We share the assumption that planning processes operate in a two-dimensional planning space defined on time and abstraction dimensions. However, we assume that people's planning activity is largely opportunistic. That is, at each point in the process, the planner's current decisions and observations suggest various opportunities for plan development. The planner's subsequent decisions follow up on selected opportunities. Sometimes, these decision-sequences follow an orderly path and produce a neat top-down expansion as described above. However, some decisions and observations might also suggest less orderly opportunities for plan development.

A key innovation of BB1 was that it applied this opportunistic planning model to its own control, using the same blackboard model of incremental, opportunistic, problem-solving that was applied to solve domain problems. Meta-level reasoning with control knowledge sources could then monitor whether planning and problem-solving were proceeding as expected or stalled. If stalled, BB1 could switch from one strategy to another as conditions – such as the goals being considered or the time remaining – changed. BB1 was applied in multiple domains: construction site planning, inferring 3-D protein structures from X-ray crystallography, intelligent tutoring systems, and real-time patient monitoring.

BB1 also allowed domain-general language frameworks to be designed for wide classes of problems. For example, the ACCORD language framework defined a particular approach to solving configuration problems. The problem-solving approach was to incrementally assemble a solution by adding objects and constraints, one at a time. Actions in the ACCORD language framework appear as short English-like commands or sentences for specifying preferred actions, events to trigger KSes, preconditions to run a KS action, and obviation conditions to discard a KS action that is no longer relevant.

GBB focused on efficiency, in contrast to BB1, which focused more on sophisticated reasoning and opportunistic planning. GBB improves efficiency by allowing blackboards to be multi-dimensional, where dimensions can be either ordered or not, and then by increasing the efficiency of pattern matching. GBB1, one of GBB's control shells implements BB1's style of control while adding efficiency improvements.

Other well-known of early academic blackboard systems are the Hearsay II speech recognition system and Douglas Hofstadter's Copycat and Numbo projects.

Some more recent examples of deployed real-world applications include:

- The PLAN component of the Mission Control System for RADARSAT-1, an Earth observation satellite developed by Canada to monitor environmental changes and Earth's natural resources.
- The GTXImage CAD software by GTX Corporation was developed in the early 1990s using a set of rulebases and neural networks as specialists operating on a blackboard system.
- Adobe Acrobat Capture (now discontinued), as it used a blackboard system to decompose and recognize image pages to understand the objects, text, and fonts on the page. This function is currently built into the retail version of Adobe Acrobat as "OCR Text Recognition". Details of a similar OCR blackboard for Farsi text are in the public domain.

Blackboard systems are used routinely in many military C4ISTAR systems for detecting and tracking objects. Another example of current use is in Game AI, where they are considered a standard AI tool to help with adding AI to video games.

== Recent developments ==
Blackboard-like systems have been constructed within modern Bayesian machine learning settings, using agents to add and remove Bayesian network nodes. In these 'Bayesian Blackboard' systems, the heuristics can acquire more rigorous probabilistic meanings as proposal and acceptances in Metropolis Hastings sampling though the space of possible structures. Conversely, using these mappings, existing Metropolis-Hastings samplers over structural spaces may now thus be viewed as forms of blackboard systems even when not named as such by the authors. Such samplers are commonly found in musical transcription algorithms for example.

Blackboard systems have also been used to build large-scale intelligent systems for the annotation of media content, automating parts of traditional social science research. In this domain, the problem of integrating various AI algorithms into a single intelligent system arises spontaneously, with blackboards providing a way for a collection of distributed, modular natural language processing algorithms to each annotate the data in a central space, without needing to coordinate their behavior.

== See also ==
- Artificial intelligence systems integration
- Autonomous decentralized systems
- Opportunistic reasoning
- Pandemonium architecture
- Tuple spaces
