= Association of Muslim Lawyers =

The Association of Muslim Lawyers (AML) is an organisation in the United Kingdom which campaigns for legal rights for Muslims and others, and to aid Muslims working in the legal professions.
