= QDriverStation =

Robotics software

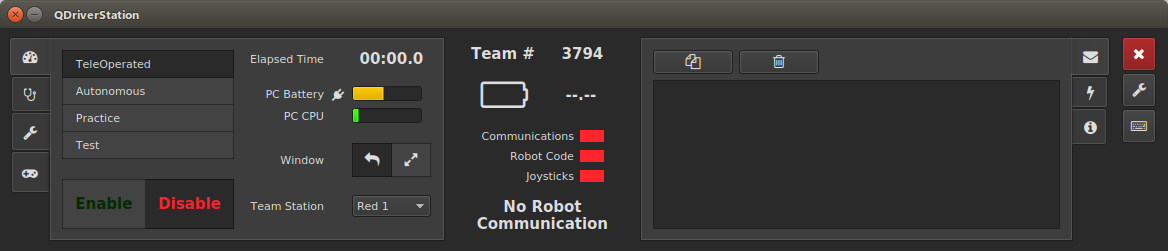
- QDriverStation main window
- Original author: Alex Spataru
- Stable release: 21.04 / April 7, 2021; 4 years ago
- Repository: github.com/FRC-Utilities/QDriverStation
- Written in: C, C++, QML
- Operating system: Windows 10, Windows 8.1, Windows 8, Windows 7, Windows Vista, Windows XP, OS X, Linux
- Available in: 3 languages
- Type: FIRST Robotics Competition, Software, Qt
- License: MIT License
- Website: frc-utilities.github.io

The QDriverStation is a free and open-source robotics software for the FIRST Robotics Competition.

The project was started in September 2015 by Alex Spataru (Team 3794), with the objective to provide a stable, free, extensible and friendly to use alternative to the FRC Driver Station. Since then, several FRC students, alumni and mentors have contributed to the project by providing feedback, documenting the communication protocols and creating Linux packages.

== Features ==
Some important features of the QDriverStation are:

- The QDriverStation implements a simple auto-updater to ensure that teams are running the latest version of the software.
- The QDriverStation uses SDL to obtain joystick input, but it also implements the option to enable a "virtual joystick", which uses the keyboard keys to operate the robot.
- The QDriverStation implements a simple sandbox around every protocol to ensure the safe operation of the robot and the software.
- The QDriverStation uses the Qt framework to implement the Graphical user interface.

== FRC communication protocols ==
The developers of the QDriverStation have implemented the 2014, 2015 and 2016 FRC communication protocols. Some users have requested to implement support for the ROS protocol, however, work for this feature has not been published yet.

== Mobile version ==
The developers of the QDriverStation have also developed a side-project for mobile devices (such as Android and iOS) with QML. The mobile version has most of the capabilities that the desktop version has.

== Screenshots ==
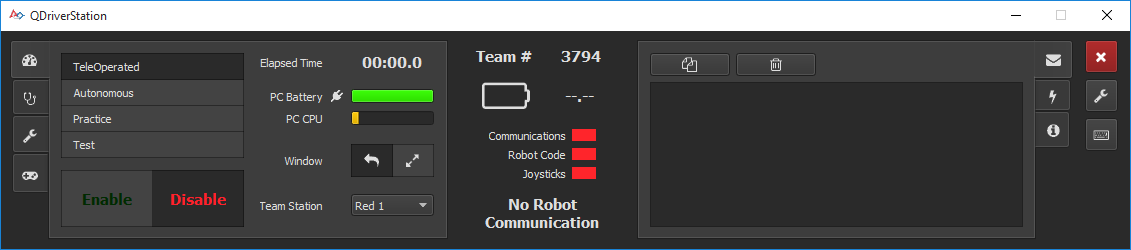
The QDriverStation running under Windows 10

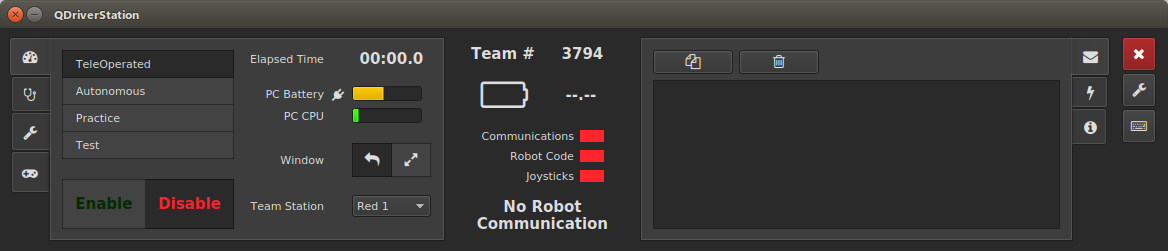
The QDriverStation running under Ubuntu 14.04

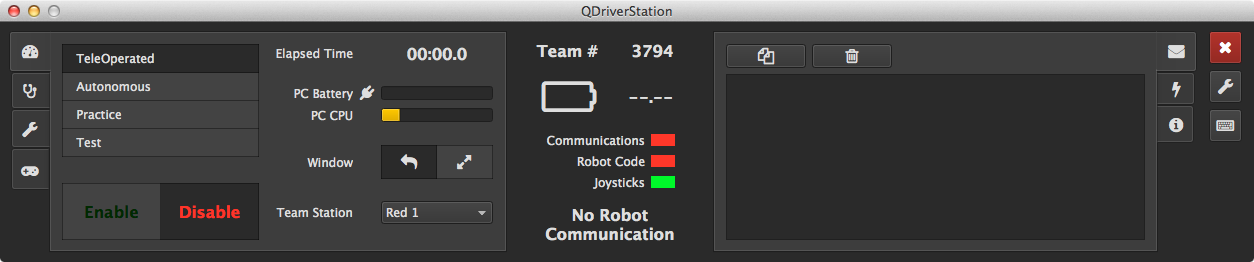
The QDriverStation running under OS X Mavericks

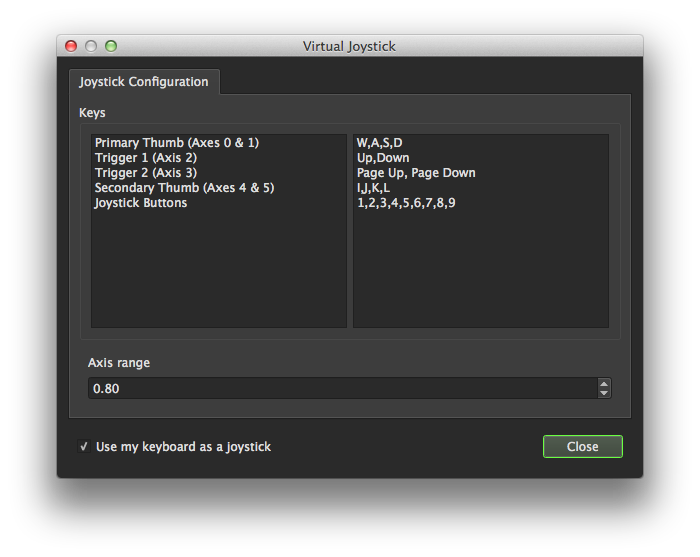
The virtual joystick options window of the QDriverStation

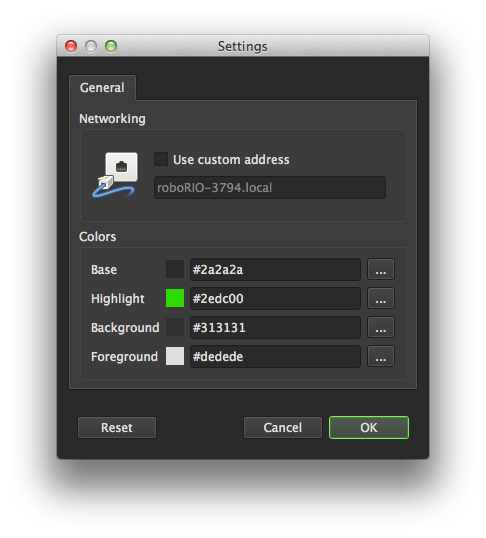
The settings window of the QDriverStation
