= Autonomous decentralized system =

Simplified schematic showing message passing in an autonomous decentralised system

An autonomous decentralized system (or ADS) is a decentralized system composed of modules or components that are designed to operate independently but are capable of interacting with each other to meet the overall goal of the system. This design paradigm enables the system to continue to function in the event of component failures. It also enables maintenance and repair to be carried out while the system remains operational. Autonomous decentralized systems have a number of applications including industrial production lines, railway signalling and robotics.

The ADS has been recently expanded from control applications to service application and embedded systems, thus autonomous decentralized service systems and autonomous decentralized device systems.

== History ==
Autonomous decentralized systems were first proposed in 1977.

ADS received significant attention as such systems have been deployed in Japanese railway systems for many years safely with over 7 billion trips, proving the value of this concept. Japan railway with ADS is considered as a smart train as it also learns.

To recognizing this outstanding contribution, Kinji Mori has received numerous awards including 2013 IEEE Life Fellow, 2012 Distinguished Service Award, Tokyo Metropolitan Government, 2012 Distinguished Specialist among 1000 in the world, Chinese Government, 2008 IEICE Fellow, 1995 IEEE Fellow 1994 Research and Development Award of Excellence Achievers, Science and Technology Agency, 1994 Ichimura Industrial Prize, 1992 Technology Achievement Award, Society of Instrument and Control Engineers, 1988 National Patent Award, Science and Technology Agency, and 1988 Mainichi Technology Prize of Excellence. Dr. Mori donated the cash from Ichimura Industrial Price to IEEE to fund the IEEE Kanai Award.

Since 1977, ADS has been a subject of research by many researchers in the world including US, Japan, EU particularly Germany, and China.

== ADS architecture ==
An ADS is a decoupled architecture where each component or subsystem communicates by message passing using shared data fields. A unique feature of the ADS is that there is no central operating system or coordinator. Instead each subsystem manages its own functionality and its coordination with other subsystems. When a subsystem needs to interact with other subsystems it broadcasts the shared data fields containing the request to all other subsystems. This broadcast does not include the identification or address of any other subsystem. Rather the other subsystems will, depending on their purpose and function, receive the broadcast message and make their own determination on what action (if any) to take.

As ADS moves into the service-oriented architecture (SOA) or ADSS (Autonomous Decentralized Service System), the data transmission can be carried out by ESB (Enterprise Service Bus), and each agent can a service that receives data from the ESB and acts according to the service specification. The results are again transmitted by the ESB to other autonomous agents.

An ADS is also similar to a blackboard system used in AI where a collection of agents will act upon seeing any data change in the common blackboard.

An ADS may include human in the loop, with both human and autonomous agents both co-learn at the same time to perform the system functionality.

Cloud computing also uses autonomous computing, but its architecture and framework are different from ADS.

== Applications ==
One application of ADS is software testing, particularly combinatorial testing. A framework has been proposed based on ADS for concurrent combinatorial testing using AR and TA.

== Conferences ==
IEEE International Symposium on Autonomous Decentralized Systems (ISADS) is the major conference on this topic. The Symposium is a biennial event and the first Symposium was held in 1993.

- ISADS 1993: 30 March – 1 April 1993, in Kawasaki, Japan
- ISADS 1995：25–27 April 1995, Phoenix, Arizona, U.S.
- ISADS 1997：9–11 April 1997, Berlin, Germany
- ISADS 1999：20–23 March 1999, Tokyo, Japan
- ISADS 2001：26–28 March 2001, Dallas, Texas, U.S.
- ISADS 2003：9–11 April 2003, Pisa, Italy
- ISADS 2005：4–8 April, 2005, Chengdu, China
- ISADS 2007：21–23 March 2007, Sedona, Arizona, U.S.
- ISADS 2009：23–25 March 2009, Athens, Greece
- ISADS 2011：29 June – 1 July 2011, Kobe, Japan
- ISADS 2013：6–8 March 2013, Mexico City, Mexico
- ISADS 2015：25–27 March 2015, Taichung, Taiwan
- ISADS 2017：22–24 March 2017, Bangkok, Thailand
- ISADS 2019：8–10 April 2019, Utrecht, Netherlands
- ISADS 2023：15–17 March 2023, Mexico City, Mexico

== See also ==
- ATOS – Japanese railway control system
- Blackboard system – Type of artificial intelligence approach
- Peer-to-peer – Type of decentralized and distributed network architecture
- Robot as a Service
- Service-oriented architecture – Architectural pattern in software design
