= Simbad robot simulator =

- Developers: Louis Hugues, Nicolas Bredèche
- Initial release: 2005
- Stable release: Simbad 1.4.0 / July 14, 2007; 18 years ago
- Operating system: Windows 7, Windows Vista, Windows XP, Linux 32 and 64 bit, Mac OS X 10.3, 10.4, 10.5, 10.6
- Type: Robotics suite
- License: GNU General Public License
- Website: simbad.sourceforge.net

Simbad robot simulator is an open-source cross-platform software simulator used to develop robotics and artificial intelligence applications. The Simbad project started in 2005, initially developed by Dr. Louis Hugues and is widely used for educational purposes. Simbad is distributed under the GNU General Public License. It is written in Java language and enables users to develop robot controllers in a simulated 3D environment.

== See also ==
- List of robotics software
