= Robotics suite =

Visual environment for robot control and simulation

A robotics suite is a visual environment for robot control and simulation. They typically serve as an end-to-end platform for robotics development, offering tools for visual programming and for creating and debugging robot applications. Developers can often interact with robots via web-based or visual interfaces.

One objective of a robotics suite is to support various robot platforms through a common programming interface. A key feature of a robotics suite is that the same code can run on either a simulated robot or the corresponding real robot without modification.

Some robotics suites are based on free software, free hardware, or both.

== Suites ==
- Fedora Robotics

== See also ==
- AnyKode Marilou
- ArduPilot
- Debian Science
- Evolution Robotics
- Lego Mindstorms
- List of robotics software
- Microsoft Robotics Studio
- Player Project (formerly the Player/Stage Project or Player/Stage/Gazebo Project)
- Robot software
- Robot Operating System
- Simbad robot simulator
- URBI
- Webots
