= KUKA Robot Language =

- Designed by: KUKA
- Developer: KUKA

Influenced by
- Pascal

The KUKA Robot Language, also known as KRL, is a proprietary programming language similar to Pascal and used to control KUKA robots.

== Features ==
Any KRL code consists of two different files with the same name: a permanent data file, with the extension .dat, and a movement command file, with the extension .src.

KRL has four basic data types:

Data type	Keyword	Meaning	Range of values
Integer	INT	Integer	${-2}^{31}-1 ... 2^{31}-1$
Real	REAL	Floating-point number	$\pm{1.1}^{-38} ... \pm{3.4}^{38}$
Boolean	BOOL	Logic state	TRUE, FALSE
Character	CHAR	Character	ASCII character

User can also create custom data types using enumeration. Enumeration and basic data types can be used to create arrays and structures.

Motion commands support several types of structures as data formats:

FRAME {X 10, Y 0, Z 500, A 0, B 0, C 0}

POS {X 10, Y 0, Z 500, A 0, B 0, C 0, S 6, T 21}

E3POS {X 10, Y 0, Z 500, A 0, B 0, C 0, S 6, T 21, E1 0, E2 0, E3 0}

E6POS {X 10, Y 0, Z 500, A 0, B 0, C 0, S 6, T 21, E1 0, E2 0, E3 0, E4 0, E5 0, E6 0}

AXIS {A1 0, A2 -90, A3 90, A4 0, A5 0, A6 0}

etc.

Robot joints are A1-A6.

External axis joints are E1-E6.

Frame value is sufficient to specify TCP location and orientation. But to also determine unique robot arm pose, additional info is required - S and T or Status and Turn. They are collection of flags stored as integer.

== See also ==
- RAPID
- List of robotics software

== Sources ==
- Braumann, Johannes; Brell-Cokcan, Sigrid (2011). Parametric Robot Control. Integrated CAD/CAM for architectural design (PDF). Archived from the original (PDF) on 28 August 2017.
- Mühe, Henrik; Angerer, Alwin; Hoffmann, Alwin; Reif, Wolfgang (2010). "On reverse-engineering the KUKA Robot Language". arXiv:1009.5004 [cs.RO].
