= Robot software =

Software related to robots

Robot software is the set of coded commands or instructions that tell a mechanical device and electronic system, known together as a robot, what tasks to perform. Robot software is used to perform autonomous tasks. Many software systems and frameworks have been proposed to make programming robots easier.

Some robot software aims at developing intelligent mechanical devices. Common tasks include feedback loops, control, pathfinding, data filtering, locating and sharing data.

== Introduction ==
Robot software is a unique form of software that can be implemented in diverse ways. Each manufacturer uses their own proprietary software versions. While most software manipulates data causing on-screen results, robotics software manipulates objects or tools in the real world.

== Industrial robot software ==
Software for industrial robots consists of data objects and lists of instructions, known as program flow (list of instructions). For example,

Go to Jig1

It is an instruction to the robot to go to positional data named Jig1. Programs can also contain implicit data, for example:

Tell axis 1 move 30 degrees.

Data and program usually reside in separate sections of the robot controller memory. One can change the data without changing the program and vice versa. For example, one can write a different program using the same Jig1 or one can adjust the position of Jig1 without changing the programs that use it.

== Examples of programming languages for industrial robots ==
Due to the highly proprietary nature of robot software, most manufacturers of robot hardware also provide their own software. While this is not unusual in other automated control systems, the lack of standardization of programming methods for robots does pose certain challenges. For example, there are over 30 different manufacturers of industrial robots, so there are also 30 different robot programming languages required. There are enough similarities between the different robots that it is possible to gain a broad-based understanding of robot programming without having to learn each manufacturer's proprietary language.

One method of controlling robots from multiple manufacturers is to use a post processor and off-line programming software. With this method, it is possible to handle brand-specific robot programming language from a universal programming language, such as Python. However, compiling and uploading fixed off-line code to a robot controller does not allow the robotic system to be state aware, so it cannot adapt its motion and recover as the environment changes. Unified real-time adaptive control for any robot is currently possible with a few different third-party tools.

Some examples of published robot programming languages are shown below.

Task in plain English:

Move to P1 (a general safe position)
Move to P2 (an approach to P3)
Move to P3 (a position to pick the object)
Close gripper
Move to P4 (an approach to P5)
Move to P5 (a position to place the object)
Open gripper
Move to P1 and finish

VAL was one of the first robot 'languages' and was used in Unimate robots. Variants of VAL have been used by other manufacturers including Adept Technology. Stäubli currently use VAL3.

Example program:

PROGRAM PICKPLACE
  1. MOVE P1
  2. MOVE P2
  3. MOVE P3
  4. CLOSEI 0.00
  5. MOVE P4
  6. MOVE P5
  7. OPENI 0.00
  8. MOVE P1
.END

Example of Stäubli VAL3 program:

begin
  movej(p1,tGripper,mNomSpeed)
  movej(appro(p3,trAppro),tGripper,mNomSpeed)
  movel(p3,tGripper,mNomSpeed)
  close(tGripper)
  movej(appro(p5,trAppro),tGripper,mNomSpeed)
  movel(p5,tGripper,mNomSpeed)
  open(tGripper)
  movej(p1,tGripper,mNomSpeed)
end

trAppro is cartesian transformation variable. If used with appro command, P2 land P4 point do not need to be defined, as the approach to position of pick and place for trajectory generation is dynamically transformed.

Epson RC+ (example for a vacuum pickup):

Function PickPlace
       Jump P1
       Jump P2
       Jump P3
       On vacuum
       Wait .1
       Jump P4
       Jump P5
       Off vacuum
       Wait .1
       Jump P1
Fend

ROBOFORTH (a language based on FORTH):

: PICKPLACE
P1
P3 GRIP WITHDRAW
P5 UNGRIP WITHDRAW
P1
;

(With Roboforth approach positions for places can be specified so P2 and P4 are not needed.)

The robot should not continue the next move until the gripper is completely closed. Confirmation or allowed time is implicit in the above examples of CLOSEI and GRIP whereas the On vacuum command requires a time delay to ensure satisfactory suction.

== Other robot programming languages ==
=== Visual programming language ===
The LEGO Mindstorms EV3 programming language is a simple language for its users to interact with. It is a graphical user interface (GUI) written with LabVIEW. The approach is to start with the program rather than the data. The program is constructed by dragging icons into the program area and adding or inserting into the sequence. For each icon, the parameters (data) are then specified. For example, for the motor drive icon which motors and how much they move are specified. When the program is written it is downloaded into the Lego NXT 'brick' (microcontroller) for testing.

=== Scripting languages ===
A scripting language is a high-level programming language that is used to control the software application, and is interpreted in real-time, or "translated on the fly", instead of being compiled in advance. A scripting language may be a general-purpose programming language or it may be limited to specific functions used to augment the running of an application or system program. Some scripting languages, such as RoboLogix, have data objects residing in registers, and the program flow represents the list of instructions, or instruction set, that is used to program the robot.

Programming languages in industrial robotics
| Robot brand | Language name |
|---|---|
| ABB | RAPID |
| Comau | PDL2 |
| Fanuc | Karel |
| Kawasaki | AS |
| Kuka | KRL |
| Stäubli | VAL3 |
| Yaskawa | Inform |

Programming languages are generally designed for building data structures and algorithms from scratch, while scripting languages are intended more for connecting, or “gluing”, components and instructions together. Consequently, the scripting language instruction set is usually a streamlined list of program commands that are used to simplify the programming process and provide rapid application development.

=== Parallel languages ===
All robotic applications need parallelism and event-based programming. Parallelism is where the robot does two or more things at the same time. This requires appropriate hardware and software. Most programming languages rely on threads or complex abstraction classes to handle parallelism and the complexity that comes with it, like concurrent access to shared resources. URBI provides a higher level of abstraction by integrating parallelism and events in the core of the language semantics.

 whenever(face.visible)
 {
   headPan.val  += camera.xfov * face.x
   &
   headTilt.val += camera.yfov * face.y
 }

The above code will move the headPan and headTilt motors in parallel to make the robot head follow the human face visible on the video taken by its camera whenever a face is seen by the robot.

== Robot application software ==
Regardless which language is used, the result of robot software is to create robotic applications that help or entertain people. Applications include command-and-control and tasking software. Command-and-control software includes robot control GUIs for tele-operated robots, point-n-click command software for autonomous robots, and scheduling software for mobile robots in factories. Tasking software includes simple drag-n-drop interfaces for setting up delivery routes, security patrols and visitor tours; it also includes custom programs written to deploy specific applications. General purpose robot application software is deployed on widely distributed robotic platforms.

=== Safety considerations ===
Programming errors represent a serious safety consideration, particularly in large industrial robots. The power and size of industrial robots mean they are capable of inflicting severe injury if programmed incorrectly or used in an unsafe manner. Due to the mass and high-speeds of industrial robots, it is always unsafe for a human to remain in the work area of the robot during automatic operation. The system can begin motion at unexpected times and a human will be unable to react quickly enough in many situations, even if prepared to do so. Thus, even if the software is free of programming errors, great care must to be taken to make an industrial robot safe for human workers or human interaction, such as loading or unloading parts, clearing a part jam, or performing maintenance. The ANSI/RIA R15.06-1999 American National Standard for Industrial Robots and Robot Systems - Safety Requirements (revision of ANSI/ R15.06-1992) book from the Robotic Industries Association is the accepted standard on robot safety. This includes guidelines for both the design of industrial robots, and the implementation or integration and use of industrial robots on the factory floor. Numerous safety concepts such as safety controllers, maximum speed during a teach mode, and use of physical barriers are covered.

== See also ==
- Artificial intelligence
- Automated planning and scheduling
- Behavior-based robotics and Subsumption architecture
- Cognitive robotics
- Cybernetics
- Developmental robotics
- Epigenetic robotics
- Evolutionary robotics
- Industrial robot
- List of AI-assisted software development tools
- List of robotics software
- RoboLogix
- Robot control
- Robotic automation software
- Robotics suite
- Swarm robotics platforms
- Telepresence
- Telerobotics
