= Robotics simulator =

Simulator to create applications for physical robots

A robotics simulator is a simulator used to create an application for a physical robot without depending on the physical machine, thus saving cost and time. In some cases, such applications can be transferred onto a physical robot (or rebuilt) without modification.

The term robotics simulator can refer to several different robotics simulation applications. For example, in mobile robotics applications, behavior-based robotics simulators allow users to create simple worlds of rigid objects and light sources and to program robots to interact with these worlds. Behavior-based simulation allows for actions that are more biotic in nature when compared to simulators that are more binary, or computational. Also, behavior-based simulators may learn from mistakes and can demonstrate the anthropomorphic quality of tenacity.

Robologix robotics simulator

One of the most popular applications for robotics simulators is for 3D modeling and rendering of a robot and its environment. This type of robotics software has a simulator that is a virtual robot, which can emulate the motion of a physical robot in a real work envelope. Some robotics simulators use a physics engine for more realistic motion generation of the robot. The use of a robotics simulator to develop a robotics control program is highly recommended regardless of whether a physical robot is available or not. The simulator allows for robotics programs to be conveniently written and debugged off-line with the final version of the program tested on a physical robot. This applies mainly to industrial robotic applications, since the success of off-line programming depends on how similar the physical environment of a robot is to a simulated environment.

Sensor-based robot actions are much more difficult to simulate and/or to program off-line, since the robot motion depends on instantaneous sensor readings in the real world.

== Features ==
Modern simulators tend to provide the following features:

- Fast robot prototyping:
  - Using the own simulator as creation tool
  - Using external tools
- Physics engines for realistic movements: Most simulators use Bullet, ODE or PhysX.
- Realistic 3d rendering: Standard 3d modeling tools or third-party tools can be used to build the environments.
- Dynamic robot bodies with scripting: C, C++, Perl, Python, Java, URBI, and MATLAB languages used by Webots; C++ used by Gazebo.

== Simulators ==
Among the newest technologies available today for programming are those which use a virtual simulation. Simulations with the use of virtual models of the working environment and the robots themselves can offer advantages to both the company and programmer. By using a simulation, costs are reduced, and robots can be programmed off-line which eliminates any down-time for an assembly line. Robot actions and assembly parts can be visualized in a three-dimensional virtual environment months before prototypes are even produced. Writing code for a simulation is also easier than writing code for a physical robot. While the move toward virtual simulations for programming robots is a step forward in user interface design, many such applications are only in their infancy.

=== General information ===
Software	Developers	Development status	License	3D rendering engine	Physics engine	3D modeller	Platforms supported
Gazebo	Open Source Robotics Foundation (OSRF)	Active	Apache 2.0	OGRE	ODE, Bullet, Simbody, DART	Internal	Linux, macOS, Windows
RoboDK	RoboDK	Active	Proprietary	OpenGL	Gravity plug-in	Internal	Linux, macOS, Windows, Android, iOS, Debian
SimSpark	O. Obst et al. (+26)	Active	GNU GPL (v2)	Internal	ODE	None	Linux, macOS, Windows
Webots	Cyberbotics Ltd.	Active	Apache 2.0	Internal (WREN)	Fork of ODE	Internal	Linux, macOS, Windows
OpenRAVE	OpenRAVE Community	Active	GNU LGPL	Coin3D, OpenSceneGraph	ODE, Bullet	Internal	Linux, macOS, Windows
CoppeliaSim	Coppelia Robotics	Active	Dual: commercial, GNU GPL	Internal	MuJoCo, Bullet, ODE, Vortex, Newton	Internal	Linux, macOS, Windows
ENCY Robot	ENCY Software	Active	Proprietary	Internal (proprietary ENCY X platform)	–	Internal (3D modeling)	Windows
Software	Developers	Development status	License	3D rendering engine	Physics engine	3D modeller	Platforms supported

=== Technical information ===
Software	Main programming language	Formats support	Extensibility	External APIs	Robotics middleware support	Primary user interface	Headless simulation
Gazebo	C++	SDF/URDF, OBJ, STL, COLLADA	Plug-ins (C++)	C++	ROS, Player, sockets (protobuf messages)	GUI	Yes
RoboDK	Python	SLDPRT, SLDASM, STEP, OBJ, STL, 3DS, COLLADA, VRML, Robot Operating System URDF, Rhinoceros 3D, ...	API, Plug-In Interface	Python, C/C++, C#, Matlab, ...	Socket	GUI	Yes
SimSpark	C++, Ruby	Ruby Scene Graphs	Mods (C++)	Network (sexpr)	Sockets (sexpr)	GUI, sockets	Unknown
Webots	C++	WBT, VRML, X3D, 3DS, Blender, BVH, COLLADA, FBX, STL, OBJ, URDF	API, PROTOs, plug-ins (C/C++)	C, C++, Python, Java, Matlab, ROS	Sockets, ROS, NaoQI	GUI	Yes
OpenRAVE	C++, Python	XML, VRML, OBJ, COLLADA	Plug-ins (C++), API	C/C++, Python, Matlab	Sockets, ROS, YARP	GUI, sockets	Yes
CoppeliaSim	C++, Python, Lua	3DS, Blender, COLLADA, STL, OBJ, URDF, SDF, GLTF, XML	Plug-ins (C/C++), embedded scripts (Python, Lua), remote API (C, C++, Python, Java, MATLAB, Octave), add-ons (Python, Lua)	C, C++, Python, Java, MATLAB, Octave, ROS, ROS 2.0	Sockets, ROS, ROS 2.0, ZeroMQ	GUI	Yes
ENCY Robot	Delphi, C#, C++	IGES, STEP, STL, DXF, VRML, Rhinoceros (3DM), Parasolid (x_t/x_b), SolidWorks (SLDPRT/SLDASM), Solid Edge (PAR/PSM/ASM/PWR), PLY, AMF, JT, PLMXML (and others) Add-ins: Alibre Design, Autodesk Inventor, IronCAD, CADbro, CAXA 3D, FreeCAD, KeyCreator, Siemens NX, Rhinoceros, SolidCAM, SolidEdge, SOLIDWORKS, SpaceClaim, ZW3D, Onshape	API; scripting	C#, Delphi, C++ (CAMIPC / IPC)	None	GUI	Yes
Software	Main programming language	Formats support	Extensibility	External APIs	Robotic middleware support	Primary user interface	Headless simulation

=== Infrastructure ===
==== Support ====
Software	Mailing list	API documentation	Public forum, help system	User manual	Issue tracker	Wiki	Chat
Gazebo	Yes	Yes	Yes	Yes	Yes	No	
RoboDK	Yes	Yes	Yes	Yes	Yes	No	Unknown
SimSpark	Yes	Yes	No	Yes	Yes	Yes	Unknown
Webots	No	Yes	Yes	Yes	Yes	Yes	Yes
OpenRAVE	Yes	Yes	Yes	Yes	Yes	Yes	Unknown
CoppeliaSim	No	Yes	Yes	Yes	Yes	Unknown	No
ENCY Robot	Yes	Yes	Yes	Yes	Unknown	No	Yes
Software	Mailing list	API documentation	Public forum, help system	User manual	Issue tracker	Wiki	

==== Code quality ====
Software	Static code checker	Style checker	Test system(s)	Test function coverage	Test branch coverage	Lines of code	Lines of comments	Continuous integration
Gazebo	cppcheck	cpplint	gtest and qtest	77.0%	53.3%	320k	106k	Jenkins
RoboDK	Unknown	Unknown	Unknown	Unknown	Unknown	Unknown	Unknown	Unknown
SimSpark	Unknown	Unknown	Unknown	Unknown	Unknown	Unknown	Unknown	Unknown
Webots	cppcheck	clang-format	unit tests	100% of API functions	master, develop	~200k	~50k	GitHub Actions
OpenRAVE	Unknown	Unknown	Python nose	Unknown	Unknown	Unknown	Unknown	Jenkins
CoppeliaSim	Unknown	Unknown	Unknown	Unknown	Unknown	Unknown	Unknown	Unknown
ENCY Robot	Unknown	Unknown	Unknown	Unknown	Unknown	Unknown	Unknown	Unknown
Software	Static code checker	Style checker	Test system(s)	Test function coverage	Test branch coverage	Lines of code	Lines of comments	Continuous integration

=== Features ===
Software	CAD to motion	Dynamic collision avoidance	Relative end effectors	Off-line programming	Real-time streaming control of hardware
Gazebo	Unknown	Yes	Yes	Yes	Yes
RoboDK	Yes	Yes	Yes	Yes	Yes
SimSpark	Unknown	No	Unknown	No	No
Webots	Unknown	Yes	Yes	Yes	Yes
OpenRAVE	Unknown	No	Unknown	No	No
CoppeliaSim	Unknown	Yes	Yes	Yes	Yes
ENCY Robot	Yes	Yes	Yes (Tool-to-part / part-to-tool)	Yes	Yes (via ENCY Hyper real-time execution)
Software	CAD to motion	Dynamic collision avoidance	Relative end effectors	Off-line programming	Real-time streaming control

==== Robot families ====
Software	UGV (ground mobile robot)	UAV (aerial robots)	AUV (underwater robots)	Robotic arms	Robotic hands (grasping simulation)	Humanoid robots	Human avatars	Full list
Gazebo	Yes	Yes	Yes	Yes	Yes	Yes	Yes	
RoboDK	No	No	No	Yes	No	No	No	Yes
SimSpark	Yes	No	No	Maybe	Maybe	Yes	No	
Webots	Yes	Yes	Yes	Yes	Yes	Yes	Yes	Yes
OpenRAVE	Yes	Unknown	Unknown	Yes	Yes	Yes	Yes	
CoppeliaSim	Yes	Yes	Yes	Yes	Yes	Yes	Yes	Yes
ENCY Robot	No	No	No	Yes	No	No	No	No
Software	UGV (ground mobile robot)	UAV (aerial robots)	AUV (underwater robots)	Robotic arms	Robotic hands (grasping simulation)	Humanoid robots	Human avatars	Full list

==== Supported actuators ====
Software	Generic kinematic chains	Force-controlled motion	Full list	Circular kinematic chains	Kinematically redundant chains	Bifurcated kinematic chains
Gazebo	Yes	Yes		Yes	Yes	Yes
RoboDK	Unknown	Unknown		Unknown	Unknown	Unknown
SimSpark	Yes	No	SimSpark effectors	Unknown	Unknown	Unknown
Webots	Yes	Yes	Webots actuators	Yes	Yes	Yes
OpenRAVE	Yes	Yes	Joints, Extra Actuators	Yes	Yes	Yes
CoppeliaSim	Yes	Yes		Yes	Yes	Yes
ENCY Robot	Yes	No	Unknown		Yes (redundancy / external axes)	Unknown
Software	Generic kinematic chains	Force-controlled motion	Full list	Circular kinematic chains	Kinematically redundant chains	Bifurcated kinematic chains

==== Supported sensors ====
Software	Odometry	IMU	Collision	GPS	Monocular cameras	Stereo cameras	Depth cameras	Omnidirectional cameras	2D laser scanners	3D laser scanners	Full list
Gazebo	Yes	Yes	Yes	Yes	Yes	Yes	Yes	Yes	Yes	Yes	
RoboDK	Unknown	Unknown	Unknown	Unknown	Unknown	Yes	Yes	Yes	Yes	Yes	
SimSpark	Yes	Yes	Yes	Partial	Yes	Partial	Unknown	Unknown	No	No	SimSpark perceptors
Webots	Yes	Yes	Yes	Yes	Yes	Yes	Yes	Yes	Yes	Yes	Webots sensors
OpenRAVE	Yes	Yes	Yes	Yes	Yes	Yes	Yes	Unknown	Yes	Yes	
CoppeliaSim	Yes	Yes	Yes	Yes	Yes	Yes	Yes	Yes	Yes	Yes	
ENCY Robot	Unknown	Unknown	Yes	Unknown	Unknown	Unknown	Unknown	Unknown	Unknown	Unknown	
Software	Odometry	IMU	Collision	GPS	Monocular cameras	Stereo cameras	Depth cameras	Omnidirectional cameras	2D laser scanners	3D laser scanners	Full list

== See also ==
- List of robotics software
