= 2012 Robocup 2D Soccer Simulation League =

Robocup Mexico 2012

Tournament details
- City: Mexico City
- Dates: June 2012
- Teams: 18

Final positions
- Champions: (Japan) HELIOS (2nd title)
- Runners-up: (China) WrightEagle
- Third place: (Iran) MarliK
- Fourth place: (Australia) Gliders

Tournament statistics
- Matches played: 152
- Goals scored: 1,299 (8.55 per match)

The 2012 RoboCup 2D Soccer Simulation League was a simulated soccer competition contested in the 16th Annual RoboCup International Symposium, held in Mexico City, Mexico, in June 2012.

== Format ==
The first stage was disputed by 18 teams divided into two groups of five teams and two groups of four teams. There were three rounds of groups. In the round 0, the three lowest ranked teams were eliminated. In the round 1, the ten lowest ranked teams were eliminated. Round 2 and 3, four teams of each round were eliminated. The four teams classified from the round 3 disputed the semifinals in two matches for each. The final and 3rd place matches were disputed in a unique game for each.

== Round stage ==
=== Round 0 ===
==== Group A ====
Team	Pld	W	D	L	GF	GA	GD	Pts
(China) WrightEagle	3	3	0	0	37	2	+35	9
(Brazil) UaiSoccer2D	3	2	0	1	4	14	−10	6
(China) GDUT_TiJi	3	1	0	2	1	12	−11	3
(Iran) Axiom	3	0	0	3	2	17	−15	0

WrightEagle (China)	10–0	(China) GDUT_TiJi
GDUT_TiJi (China)	1–0	(Iran) Axiom
Axiom (Iran)	1–2	(Brazil) UaiSoccer2D
UaiSoccer2D (Brazil)	1–13	(China) WrightEagle
WrightEagle (China)	14–1	(Iran) Axiom
GDUT_TiJi (China)	0–1	(Brazil) UaiSoccer2D

==== Group B ====
Team	Pld	W	D	L	GF	GA	GD	Pts
FCPortugal	4	3	1	0	6	3	+3	10
(China) YuShan	4	3	0	1	15	4	+11	9
(Germany) robOTTO	4	2	0	2	5	6	−1	6
(Romania) Oxsy	4	1	0	3	4	11	−7	3
(Iran) NADCO-2D	4	0	1	3	4	10	−6	1

Oxsy (Romania)	0–1	(Germany) robOTTO
robOTTO (Germany)	3–1	(Iran) NADCO-2D
NADCO-2D (Iran)	0–2	(China) YuShan
YuShan (China)	2–3	FCPortugal
FCPortugal	1–0	(Romania) Oxsy
Oxsy (Romania)	4–2	(Iran) NADCO-2D
roboOTTO (Germany)	1–4	(China) YuShan
NADCO-2D (Iran)	1–1	FCPortugal
Yushan (China)	7–0	(Romania) Oxsy
FCPortugal	1–0	(Germany) robOTTO

==== Group C ====
Team	Pld	W	D	L	GF	GA	GD	Pts
(Australia) Gliders	4	3	1	0	6	3	+3	10
(Iran) MarliK	4	3	0	1	15	4	+11	9
(Brazil) GPR-2D	4	2	0	2	5	6	−1	6
(Iran) AUT_2D	4	1	0	3	4	11	−7	3
(Iran) Riton	4	0	1	3	4	10	−6	1

==== Group D ====
Team	Pld	W	D	L	GF	GA	GD	Pts
(Japan) HELIOS	3	3	0	0	46	1	+45	9
(Brazil) ITAndroids	3	2	0	1	37	8	+29	6
(Japan) Ri-one	3	1	0	2	37	12	+25	3
(Mexico) Borregos	3	0	0	3	0	99	−99	0

=== Round 1 ===
==== Group E ====
Team	Pld	W	D	L	GF	GA	GD	Pts
(China) WrightEagle	8	8	0	0	53	7	+46	24
(China) YuShan	8	4	3	1	15	12	+3	15
(Australia) Gliders	8	3	3	2	18	17	+1	12
(Brazil) ITAndroids	8	3	2	3	13	19	−6	11
(Iran) Riton	8	2	4	2	10	10	0	10
(China) GDUT_TiJi	8	3	1	4	18	19	−1	10
(Brazil) GPR-2D	8	2	3	3	5	10	−5	9
(Romania) Oxsy	8	2	0	6	10	27	−17	6
(Brazil) Warthog	8	0	2	6	4	25	−21	2

==== Group F ====
Team	Pld	W	D	L	GF	GA	GD	Pts
(Japan) HELIOS	8	8	0	0	45	1	+44	24
(Iran) MarliK	8	6	1	1	18	2	+16	19
(Iran) Axiom	8	4	0	4	11	15	−4	12
FCPortugal	8	4	0	4	10	17	−7	12
(Iran) AUT_2D	8	3	1	4	11	16	−5	10
(Germany) robOTTO	8	3	1	4	11	17	−6	10
(Iran) NADCO-2D	8	3	0	5	14	21	−7	9
(Japan) Ri-One	8	2	0	6	9	17	−8	6
(Brazil) UaiSoccer2D	8	1	1	6	5	28	−23	4

=== Round 2 ===
==== Group G ====
Team	Pld	W	D	L	GF	GA	GD	Pts
(China) WrightEagle	5	5	0	0	19	3	+16	15
(Germany) robOTTO	5	3	0	2	9	7	+2	9
(Iran) MarliK	5	3	0	2	7	8	−1	9
(Australia) Gliders	5	3	0	2	9	11	−2	9
FCPortugal	5	1	0	4	7	11	−4	3
(Iran) Riton	5	0	0	5	8	19	−11	0

==== Group H ====
Team	Pld	W	D	L	GF	GA	GD	Pts
(Japan) HELIOS	5	5	0	0	14	0	+14	15
(China) GDUT_TiJi	5	3	1	1	12	9	+3	10
(Iran) AUT_2D	5	2	2	1	9	6	+3	8
(China) YuShan	5	2	1	2	10	13	−3	7
(Brazil) ITAndroids	5	1	0	4	5	13	−8	3
(Iran) Axiom	5	0	0	5	4	13	−9	0

=== Round 3 ===
==== Group I ====
Team	Pld	W	D	L	GF	GA	GD	Pts
(Japan) HELIOS	3	3	0	0	4	0	+4	9
(Australia) Gliders	3	2	0	1	5	1	+4	6
(Iran) AUT_2D	3	1	0	2	1	3	−2	3
(Germany) robOTTO	3	0	0	3	0	6	−6	0

==== Group J ====
Team	Pld	W	D	L	GF	GA	GD	Pts
(China) WrightEagle	3	3	0	0	13	3	+10	9
(Iran) MarliK	3	1	1	1	3	3	0	4
(China) GDUT_TiJi	3	1	0	2	4	8	−4	3
(China) YuShan	3	0	1	2	4	10	−6	1

== Finals ==
Semifinals
1	(Japan) HELIOS	4	1	5
4	(Iran) MarliK	1	0	1
3	(China) WrightEagle	2	2	4
2	(Australia) Gliders	0	0	0

Finals
(Japan) HELIOS	4
(China) WrightEagle	1
Third place
(Australia) Gliders	0
(Iran) MarliK	1

== Honours ==
2012 Robocup 2D Soccer Simulation League

HELIOS
Winner
(2nd title)

== See also ==
- RoboCup
- RoboCup Simulation League
- RoboCup 3D Soccer Simulation League
