= CoppeliaSim =

Robot simulator used in industry, education and research

- Developer: Coppelia Robotics AG
- Stable release: 4.10 / May 14th, 2025
- Operating system: Windows, Linux, macOS
- Type: Robotics simulator
- License: Dual licensed (commercial or GPL)
- Website: Coppelia Robotics web page

CoppeliaSim, formerly known as V-REP, is a robot simulator used in industry, education and research. It was originally developed within Toshiba R&D and is currently being actively developed and maintained by Coppelia Robotics AG, a small company located in Zurich, Switzerland.

It is built around a distributed control architecture having Python and Lua scripts, or C/C++ plug-ins acting as individual, synchronous controllers. Additional asynchronous controllers can execute in another process, thread or machine via various middleware solutions (ROS, remote API, ZeroMQ) with programming languages such as C/C++, Python, Java and Matlab.

CoppeliaSim uses a kinematics engine for forward and inverse kinematics calculations, and several physics simulation libraries (MuJoCo, Bullet, ODE, Vortex, Newton Game Dynamics) to perform rigid body simulation. Models and scenes are built by assembling various objects (meshes, joints, various sensors, Point clouds, octrees, etc.) into a hierarchical structure. Additional functionality, provided by plug-ins, include: motion planning (via OMPL), synthetic vision and imaging processing (e.g. via OpenCV), collision detection, minimum distance calculation, custom graphical user interfaces and Data visualization (e.g. via plots).

The main fields of application of CoppeliaSim are robotics research and education.

== See also ==
- List of robotics software
