= Gazebo (simulator) =

Open-source 3D robotics simulator

- Other names: Ignition
- Release: 2002
- Stable release: Jetty
- Operating system: Microsoft Windows Linux Macintosh
- Website: https://gazebosim.org/
- Repository: github.com/gazebosim/gazebo-classic (Gazebo Classic) github.com/gazebosim/gz-sim (Gazebo)

Gazebo is an open-source 2D/3D robotics simulator that began development in 2002. In 2017, development forked into two versions: "Gazebo", the original monolithic architecture, and "Ignition", which had evolved into a modernized collection of loosely coupled libraries. Following a trademark obstacle in 2022 regarding their use of the name "Ignition", Open Robotics took the opportunity to switch the version names, dubbing the original fork "Gazebo Classic" and the new, modern fork "Gazebo". Gazebo Classic integrated the ODE physics engine, OpenGL rendering, and support code for sensor simulation and actuator control. Gazebo Classic was discontinued in early 2025.

The default physics engine Gazebo Classic uses is ODE, though other engines, such as Bullet, can also be used. It provides a realistic rendering of environments, including high-quality lighting, shadows, and textures. It can model sensors that "see" the simulated environment, such as laser range finders, cameras (including wide-angle), Kinect style sensors, etc. For 3D rendering, Gazebo Classic uses the OGRE engine.

== Development history ==
Timeline of important Gazebo software development-related dates

Gazebo was a component in the Player Project from 2002 through 2011. In 2011, Gazebo became an independent project supported by Willow Garage. In 2012, the Open Source Robotics Foundation OSRF) became the steward of the Gazebo project. OSRF changed its name to Open Robotics in 2018.

Gazebo Classic's last major release was version 11, a long-term support release. v11.15.1 that was released on December 3, 2024 is the final release of Gazebo Classic. All previously released versions of Gazebo also received long-term support, with minor updates being released for Gazebo 9 and 10 together with the release of Gazebo 11.0.0. With Gazebo 11 being released in January 2020, Open Robotics shifted its focus to developing Ignition, a "collection of the open source software libraries designed to simplify the development of high-performance applications", with a target audience of robot developers, designers, and educators. The first version of Ignition was released in February 2019. In April 2022, following a trademark dispute, the Ignition brand name was retired and reverted to Gazebo. Gazebo's website refers to the original standalone Gazebo simulator as Gazebo Classic in order to disambiguate it from Gazebo. Open Robotics mentioned the need for significant modernization in Gazebo's code, together with the opportunity to move from a monolithic architecture to a collection of loosely coupled libraries.

Gazebo Classic reached end-of-life on January 29, 2025, and was replaced by the modern fork.

== Competitions ==
Gazebo has been used as the simulation environment for several technology challenges and competitions.

=== DARPA Robotics Challenge (DRC) ===
2012 to 2015

- The DARPA Robotics Challenge was a prize competition funded by the US Defense Advanced Research Projects Agency. It aimed to develop semi-autonomous ground robots that could do "complex tasks in dangerous, degraded, human-engineered environments."
- The simulation stage, the Virtual Robotics Challenge, took place June 17–21, 2013 and was won by Team IHMC, Institute for Human and Machine Cognition, Pensacola, Fla.
- Link to simulation environment at https://github.com/osrf/drcsim

=== NASA Space Robotics Challenge (SRC) ===
2016 to 2017

- The NASA Space Robotics Challenge tasks teams with developing and displaying the ability of an R5 (Valkyrie) robot to assist in the procedures of a NASA mission, such as one to Mars, offering a $1 million prize pool.
- NASA selected 20 finalist teams based on their performance in completing some tasks in the Gazebo 3D robot simulator, and each of those finalists had to program a Valkyrie humanoid to complete a repair mission on a simulated Mars base.
- The winner of the SRC was team Coordinated Robotics.
- Link to simulation environment at https://bitbucket.org/osrf/srcsim

=== Toyota Prius Challenge ===
2016 to 2017

- The Prius Challenge is a competition where participants battle it out to see who can achieve the best fuel economy and efficiency rating on a Prius within a target time range. Toyota Research Institute (TRI) welcomes competitors to the event at Sonoma (CA) Raceway on March 3, 2017
- Open Robotics created a Gazebo-based simulation environment for the competition in which teams practiced and tested theories and strategies for the race-day competition.
- Twenty teams competed in the event, which was won by Echo 12 with an average of 85 mpg, and the winner for the best overall lap was Team El Diablo with 211 mpg
- Link to simulation environment at https://bitbucket.org/osrf/priuscup/src/default/
- Link to Prius Challenge at https://www.openrobotics.org/customer-stories/prius-challenge

=== Agile Robotics for Industrial Automation Competition (ARIAC) ===
2016 to 2023

The National Institute of Standards and Technology (NIST) held the first ARIAC Competition in June 2017. The goal of the competition was to test the agility of industrial robot systems, with the goal of enabling industrial robots on the shop floors to be more productive, more autonomous, and to require less time from shop floor workers.

- First place in the 2017 ARIAC competition was won by Realization of Robotics Systems (Center for Advanced Manufacturing, University of Southern California).
- First place in the 2018 ARIAC competition was won by Team Sirius (Denbar Robotics).
- First place in the 2019 ARIAC competition was won again by Team Sirius (Denbar Robotics).
- First place in the 2020 ARIAC competition was won by Team Virsli (Budapest University of Technology and Economics (BME VIK TMIT), HSN Lab, Cloud Robotics Group).
- First place in the 2021 ARIAC competition was won by Team Reaper (Shenyang Institute of Automation, Chinese Academy of Sciences, NCS Lab, Intelligent Manufacturing System Group).
- First place in the 2022 ARIAC competition was won by Team Reaper (Shenyang Institute of Automation, Chinese Academy of Sciences, NCS Lab, Intelligent Manufacturing System Group).
- First place in the 2023 ARIAC competition was won by Team Reaper (Shenyang Institute of Automation, Chinese Academy of Sciences, NCS Lab, Intelligent Manufacturing System Group).
- Simulation environment at https://bitbucket.org/osrf/ariac/wiki/Home

=== DARPA Service Academy Swarm Challenge (SASC) ===
2016 to 2017

- DARPA created the Service Academies Swarm Challenge to help make effective unmanned aerial vehicle (UAV) swarm tactics a reality. The Challenge is a collaboration between DARPA and the three U.S. military Service academies—the United States Military Academy, the United States Naval Academy, and the United States Air Force Academy.
- The U.S. Naval Academy was declared the winner of the competition
- Simulation environment at https://github.com/osrf/uctf

=== DARPA Subterranean Challenge (SubT) ===
2018 to 2021

- The DARPA Subterranean or “SubT” Challenge seeks novel approaches to rapidly map, navigate, and search underground environments during time-sensitive combat operations or disaster response scenarios.
- Teams in the Virtual track will compete for up to $1.5 million in the Virtual Final event, with additional prizes of up to $500,000 for self-funded teams in each of the Virtual Circuit events.
- Simulation environment at https://bitbucket.org/osrf/subt/wiki/Home

== See also ==
- List of robotics software
