= 1998 Robocup 2D Soccer Simulation League =

1998 RoboCup 2D Soccer Simulation League
Robocup France 1998

Tournament details
- City: (France) Paris
- Dates: July 1998
- Teams: 34

Final positions
- Champions: (United States) CMUnited (1st title)
- Runners-up: (Germany) AT_Humboldt
- Third place: (Netherlands) Windmill Wanderers
- Fourth place: (United States) ISIS

The 1998 Robocup 2D Soccer Simulation League was a simulated soccer competition contested in the 1st Annual RoboCup International Symposium, held in Paris, France.

== Round stage ==
=== Group A ===
Team	Pld	W	D	L	GF	GA	GD	Pts
(Netherlands) Windmill Wanderers	4	4	0	0	36	0	+36	12
(Japan) Andhill	4	3	0	1	54	1	+53	9
(Germany) Delphine	4	2	0	2	11	30	−19	6
(Brazil) UFSC	4	0	0	4	0	29	−29	0
(Sweden) DSV	4	0	0	4	1	43	−42	0

=== Group B ===
Team	Pld	W	D	L	GF	GA	GD	Pts
(Germany) AT_Humboldt97	3	3	0	0	21	0	+21	9
(Iran) NRC	3	2	0	1	4	8	−4	6
(Belgium) Louvains	3	1	0	2	1	11	−10	3
(France) CER	3	0	0	3	0	7	−7	0

=== Group C ===
Team	Pld	W	D	L	GF	GA	GD	Pts
(Germany) AT_Humboldt	4	4	0	0	59	0	+59	12
(Netherlands) AIACS	4	3	0	1	40	6	+34	9
(Romania) TU Cluj	4	2	0	2	8	30	−22	6
(United States) Darbotics	4	1	0	3	2	30	−28	3
(Japan) ERIKA	4	0	0	4	0	43	−43	0

=== Group D ===
Team	Pld	W	D	L	GF	GA	GD	Pts
(Japan) Gemini	3	3	0	0	38	0	+38	9
(Germany) Cosmoz	3	2	0	1	18	6	+12	6
(France) Footux	3	1	0	2	2	37	−35	3
(United States) Texas	3	0	0	3	0	25	−25	0

=== Group E ===
Team	Pld	W	D	L	GF	GA	GD	Pts
(Japan) Miya2	3	2	1	0	4	0	+4	7
(Italy) PaSo Team	3	2	0	1	11	3	+8	6
(United States) Darwin United	3	1	1	1	1	5	−4	4
(Germany) Ulm-Sparrow	3	0	0	3	2	10	−8	0

=== Group F ===
Team	Pld	W	D	L	GF	GA	GD	Pts
(Germany) Mainz Rolling Brains	3	2	1	0	14	1	+13	7
CAT Finland	3	2	0	1	8	4	+4	6
(Canada) UCB Dynamo	3	1	1	1	4	2	+2	4
(Japan) NIT	3	0	0	3	2	21	−19	0

=== Group G ===
Team	Pld	W	D	L	GF	GA	GD	Pts
(United States) ISIS	3	2	1	0	23	2	+21	7
(Sweden) Linköping Lizards	3	2	1	0	10	2	+8	7
(Japan) Kappa	3	1	0	2	4	13	−9	3
(Germany) Brainstormers	3	0	0	3	0	20	−20	0

=== Group H ===
Team	Pld	W	D	L	GF	GA	GD	Pts
(United States) CMUnited	3	3	0	0	29	0	+29	9
(Germany) TUM	3	2	0	1	22	3	+19	6
(Japan) Kasugabito	3	1	0	2	9	11	−2	3
(Netherlands) UU	3	0	0	3	0	46	−46	0

== Knockout stage ==
Upper round 1	Upper round 2	Upper round 3	Upper final	Final
(Netherlands) Windmill Wanderers	4
(Germany) TUM	0
(Netherlands) Windmill Wanderers	8
(Sweden) Linköping Lizards	0
(Germany) AT_Humboldt97	1
(Sweden) Linköping Lizards	3
(Netherlands) Windmill Wanderers	2
(Germany) AT_Humboldt	0
(Germany) AT_Humboldt	8
CAT Finland	0
(Germany) AT_Humboldt	10
(Japan) Gemini	0
(Japan) Gemini	8
(Italy) PaSo Team	0
(Netherlands) Windmill Wanderers	0
(United States) CMUnited	1
(Japan) Miya2	0
(Germany) Cosmoz	6
(Germany) Cosmoz	8
(Germany) Mainz Rolling Brains	0
(Germany) Mainz Rolling Brains	7
(Netherlands) AIACS	2
(Germany) Mainz Rolling Brains	0
(United States) CMUnited	13
(United States) ISIS	6
(France) MicRob	0
(United States) ISIS	0	(United States) CMUnited	3
(United States) CMUnited	12	(Germany) AT_Humboldt	0
(United States) CMUnited	8
(Japan) Andhill	0
Lower round 1	Lower round 2	Lower round 3	Lower round 4	Lower round 5	Lower final
(Japan) Gemini	5
(Germany) AT_Humboldt97	8
(Germany) TUM	7	(Germany) TUM	2
(Japan) Gemini	0	(Japan) Andhill	0
(Germany) AT_Humboldt97	1
(Japan) Andhill	9	(Netherlands) Windmill Wanderers	1
(Germany) Cosmoz	0
(Germany) AT_Humboldt97	12	(Germany) AT_Humboldt97	2
(France) MicRob	0	(Japan) Andhill	12
(United States) ISIS	0
(Japan) Andhill	23
(Sweden) Linköping Lizards	1
(Germany) Mainz Rolling Brains	0
CAT Finland	6	CAT Finland	2
CAT Finland	1	(United States) ISIS	2
(Italy) PaSo Team	0
(United States) ISIS	2
(United States) ISIS	4
(Japan) Miya2	0	(Netherlands) AIACS	2
(Netherlands) AIACS	11

== Honours ==
1998 Robocup 2D Soccer Simulation League

CMUnited
Winner
(1st title)

== See also ==
- RoboCup
- RoboCup Simulation League
- RoboCup 3D Soccer Simulation League
