= D-Box Technologies =

Motion effects company

D-BOX Technologies Inc.
- Type: Public
- Traded as: TSX: DBO
- Industry: entertainment, movie theaters, sim racing, gaming, home theaters, professional simulation and training, attractions and theme parks
- Founded: June 19, 1998; 28 years ago
- Founder: Philippe Roy
- Headquarters: Longueuil, Quebec, Canada
- Area served: Worldwide
- Key people: Naveen Prasad, President and CEO
- Products: haptic actuators, software
- Website: DBOX

D-BOX Technologies Inc. (informally known simply as DBOX) is a Canadian haptic motion technology company based in Longueuil, Quebec. The company designs and manufactures motion and haptic systems for entertainment, simulation, and training industries. Combining haptic technology with actuators provides physical sensations in a virtual setting. As of July 2019, D-BOX seats were located at over 700 movie screens in 40 countries.

The company was founded in 1998. Naveen Prasad is the president and CEO.

== History ==
D-BOX was originally founded in 1998 as a manufacturer of powerful subwoofers. Michel Jacques was the company's president and CEO. The company noticed customers were buying multiple subwoofers to place around seats to mimic a motion effect. D-BOX decided to shift its focus to motion technology; in 2001, the company released its first generation of D-BOX motion seating systems. The company initially focused on the theatrical-exhibition market rather than home consumers, due to the high cost of a single chair.

In August 2005, Claude McMaster became the company's President and CEO.

In 2009, Nikki Rocco, president of distribution at Universal Pictures, asked D-BOX to use its motion technology for the 2009 film Fast & Furious. The project was successful, and was considered a company milestone. That year, the company reached an agreement with Canadian exhibitor Cineplex Entertainment to install D-BOX seats at its locations, with the first opening in July 2009.

In October 2018, the company entered the sports simulation market, and displayed a Formula 1 simulator at a sports conference in London.

In November, Variety announced that D-BOX was working to develop an amusement park ride based on Ubisoft's popular Rabbids title.

In May 2019, the company announced that its simulation technology was being used by Monaco-based company RS Simulation in its Sector One racing simulator.

By July 2019, D-BOX seats were located at over 700 screens in 40 countries. In August, the company announced that Australian and New Zealand-based company Hoyts was installing D-BOX seats in its theaters. In October, the company announced it was partnering with India-based film chain PVR Cinemas to install its seats in Indian cinemas, and that the 2019 Indian action film War would incorporate the motion technology coding.

On April 1, 2020, the company announced that Sébastien Mailhot was taking on the role of President and CEO. In September, British simulation company Cranfield Simulations announced a $170,000 home Formula 1 simulator using D-BOX's suspension platform. In November, the company announced a lower cost chair designed for the home entertainment market. In December, the company announced it was working with gaming hardware manufacturer Cooler Master to produce a gaming chair featuring full-body haptic technology.

In December 2022, D-BOX collaborated with simulation company RSEAT to develop the HF-L4, a sim racing and theatre system based on D-BOX's G5 haptic motion system.

== Products and services ==
D-BOX produces haptic (motion) effects programmed for visual and musical content, which are sent to a motion system integrated either within a platform, a seat, or various types of equipment. Sounds and action are hand-encoded to link to motion effects. Its technology is used for various industries including movie theaters, sim racing, gaming, home entertainment, commercial training and simulation; and attractions and theme parks.

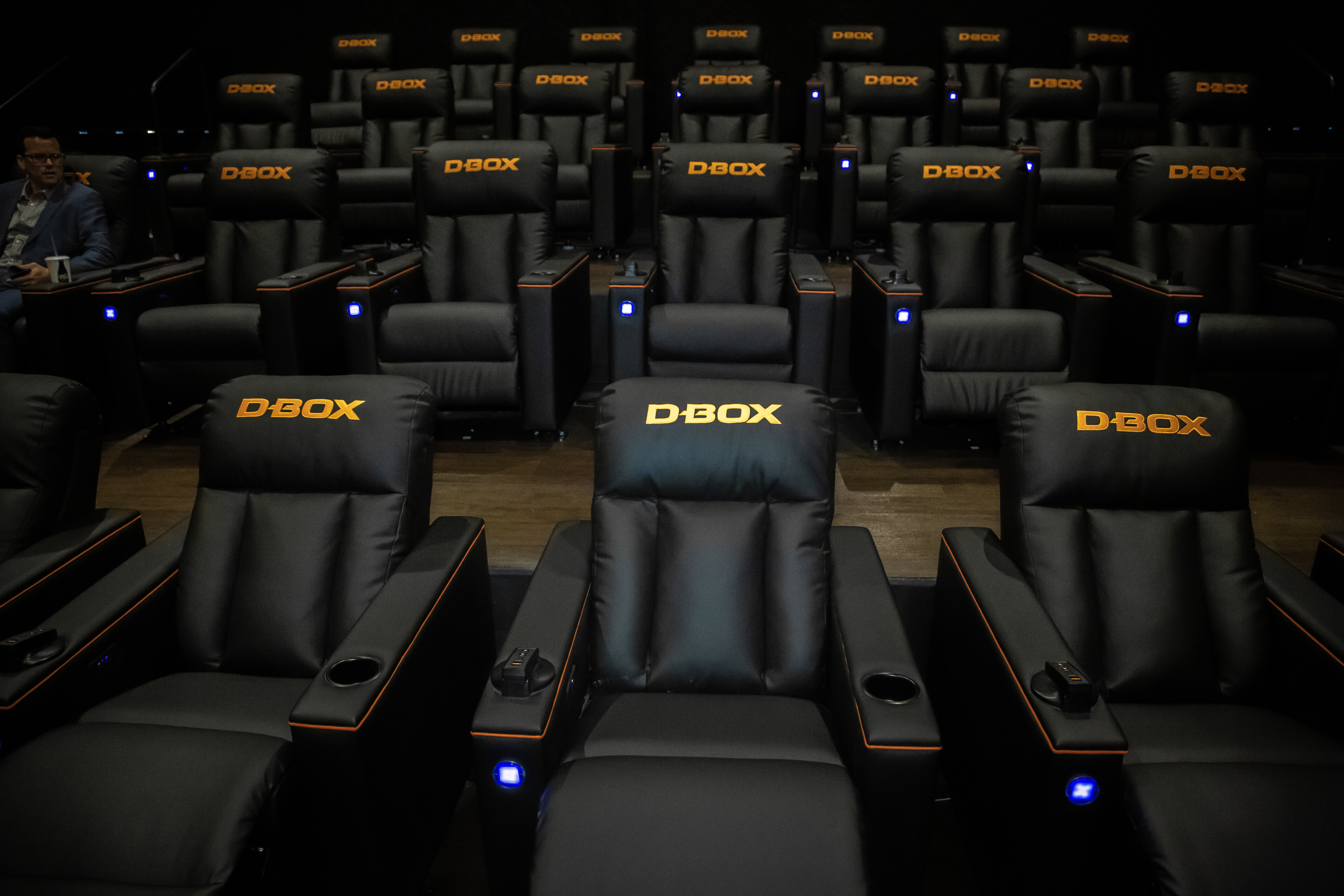
D-BOX opened its first full auditorium with Maya Cinemas in North Las Vegas in January 2019.

=== Movie theaters ===
The first feature film to have been encoded with D-BOX was Fast & Furious; multiple D-BOX seats were installed at Grauman's Chinese Theatre in Hollywood for the premiere, as well as a cinema in Surprise, Arizona. As of January 2025, D-BOX estimated that its seats were installed in over 1,000 cinemas worldwide.

In digital cinema, D-BOX codes for motion control are stored in the Digital Cinema Package for the film. Control data is encoded in a monoaural WAV file on Sound Track channel 13, labelled as "Motion Data". Motion Data tracks are unencrypted and not watermarked.

=== Sim racing ===
D-BOX's technology is used by a variety of manufacturers to develop simulation technology. D-BOX's haptic system is the only official haptic technology licensed by the Fédération Internationale de l'Automobile (FIA), and the company is also the Official Haptic Partner of eNASCAR.

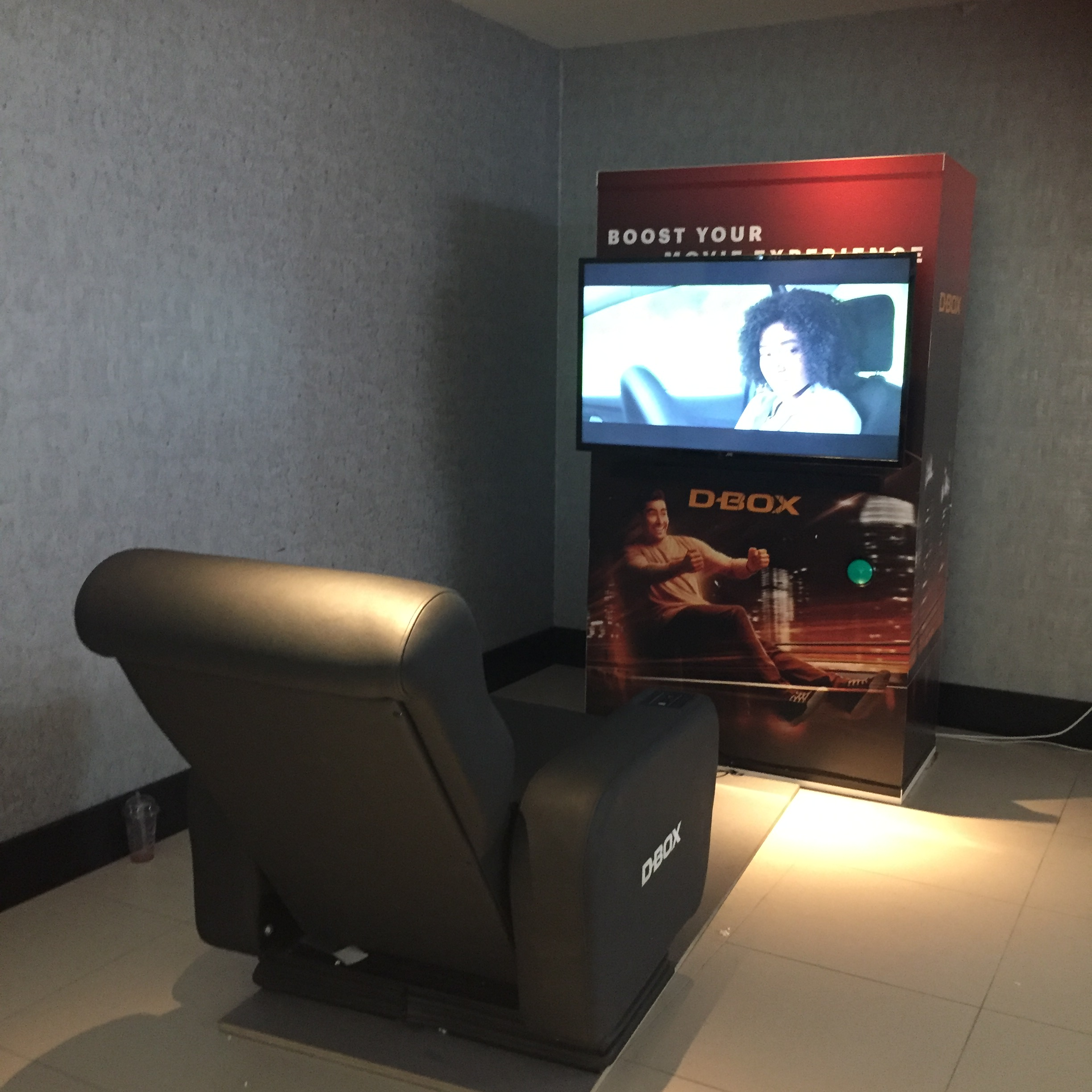
A D-BOX kiosk.

=== Gaming ===
D-BOX partners with gaming companies such as Ubisoft to license its technology for video games, including Assassin's Creed Valhalla. The company also partners with haptic gaming chair manufacturers such as Cooler Master.

=== Home entertainment ===
D-BOX Technologies first introduced its motion generating systems in 2001 to the home theater, Sim racing, Esports and PC gaming markets. The D-BOX system can be integrated within single seats or full with many seats theaters. For existing seating, motion can be added using a D-BOX Motion Platform.

=== Commercial simulation and training ===
D-BOX technology is used for simulation and training by companies including heavy equipment companies Caterpillar and John Deere, and commercial simulation company CM Labs Simulations. The company's motion and haptic equipment is also installed in helicopter flight simulators at the American base of Fort Novosel in Alabama (formerly Fort Rucker), as part of simulators provided by the Australian company Ryan Aerospace, and the American company Precision Flight Controls.

=== Attractions and theme parks ===
D-BOX also provides technology to operators of immersive attractions and theme parks. Projects include SpongeBob VR, created in partnership with virtual reality attraction manufacturer MajorMega and VR studio Creative Works, MajorMega's HyperDeck VR attraction, and the Asterix-themed ride Attention Menhir! at French theme park Parc Astérix.

== Exhibitors ==
Exhibitors installing D-BOX equipment in their theaters include:

- AMC
- Cinemark Theatres
- Cineplex Entertainment
- Hoyts
- Maya Cinemas
- Ster-Kinekor
- D'Place Entertainment

== Studios ==
D-BOX works with movie studios including:

- Paramount Pictures
- Universal Pictures
- Walt Disney Studios
- Warner Bros.
- Yash Raj Films

== Operations ==
D-BOX is headquartered in Longueuil, Canada, and has satellite offices in Beijing and Los Angeles. Naveen Prasad is the company's President and CEO. The company reportedly has 90 employees.
