= RoboDK =

Software

- Operating system: Windows, MacOS, Linux
- Available in: English, Spanish, French, German, Italian, Chinese
- Type: Simulation software
- License: Proprietary software
- Website: www.robodk.com

RoboDK is an offline programming and simulation software for industrial robots. The simulation software allows you to program robots outside the production environment, eliminating production downtime caused by shop floor programming.

RoboDK includes tools that can be used for many robotics projects including milling, welding, pick and place, packaging and labelling, palletizing, painting, robot calibration and more.

== History ==
While working on his PhD at CoRo lab, Albert Nubiola was the main developer of RoKiSim, a multi-platform educational software tool for 3D simulation of serial six-axis robots.

In January 2015, RoboDK was founded by Albert Nubiola as a spin-off company from the CoRo laboratory at ETS University in Montreal. RoboDK software is the extended commercial version of RoKiSim and is designed to bring powerful robotics simulation and programming capabilities to companies large and small and to coders and non-coders alike.

At launch, the RoboDK library supported 200 robots from more than 20 robot manufacturers.

RoboDK launched when the first customer, a New Zealand-based manufacturer, wanted to use RoboDK to calibrate an ABB robot for robot milling. Since then RoboDK has provided solutions for companies around the world such as NASA, Spotify, Wilder Systems, and many more.

== Main features ==
=== Robot brand independence ===
RoboDK has a library of over 1000 robots from more than 50 different manufacturers including ABB, Fanuc, Kuka, Yaskawa Motoman, Universal Robots, Omron.

=== User interface ===
The user interface enables easy simulation and doesn't require any previous programming knowledge.

== File format ==
=== Filename extensions ===
RoboDK's native file formats are denoted as .rdk this file can be referred as a RoboDK station or RoboDK file. A RoboDK station is where the virtual environment station and calibration information is stored.

=== Supported formats ===
RoboDK supports most standard 3D formats such as STL, STEP (or STP) and IGES (or IGS) formats. Other formats such as VRML, 3DS or OBJ are also supported.

=== Export format ===
RoboDK post processors allow for programs to be exported to an actual robot including, ABB Rapid (mod/prog), Fanuc LS (LS/TP), Kuka KRC/IIWA (SRC/java), Yaskawa Motoman Inform (JBI), Universal Robots (URP and URscript), Kawasaki (PG files), HIWIN (HRB) and more.

== See also ==
- List of robotics software
