= RoboCup 2D Soccer Simulation League =

- Founded: 1997
- Region: International
- Current champions: (Japan) Helios
- Most championships: (Japan) Helios (8 titles)
- Website: www.robocup.org

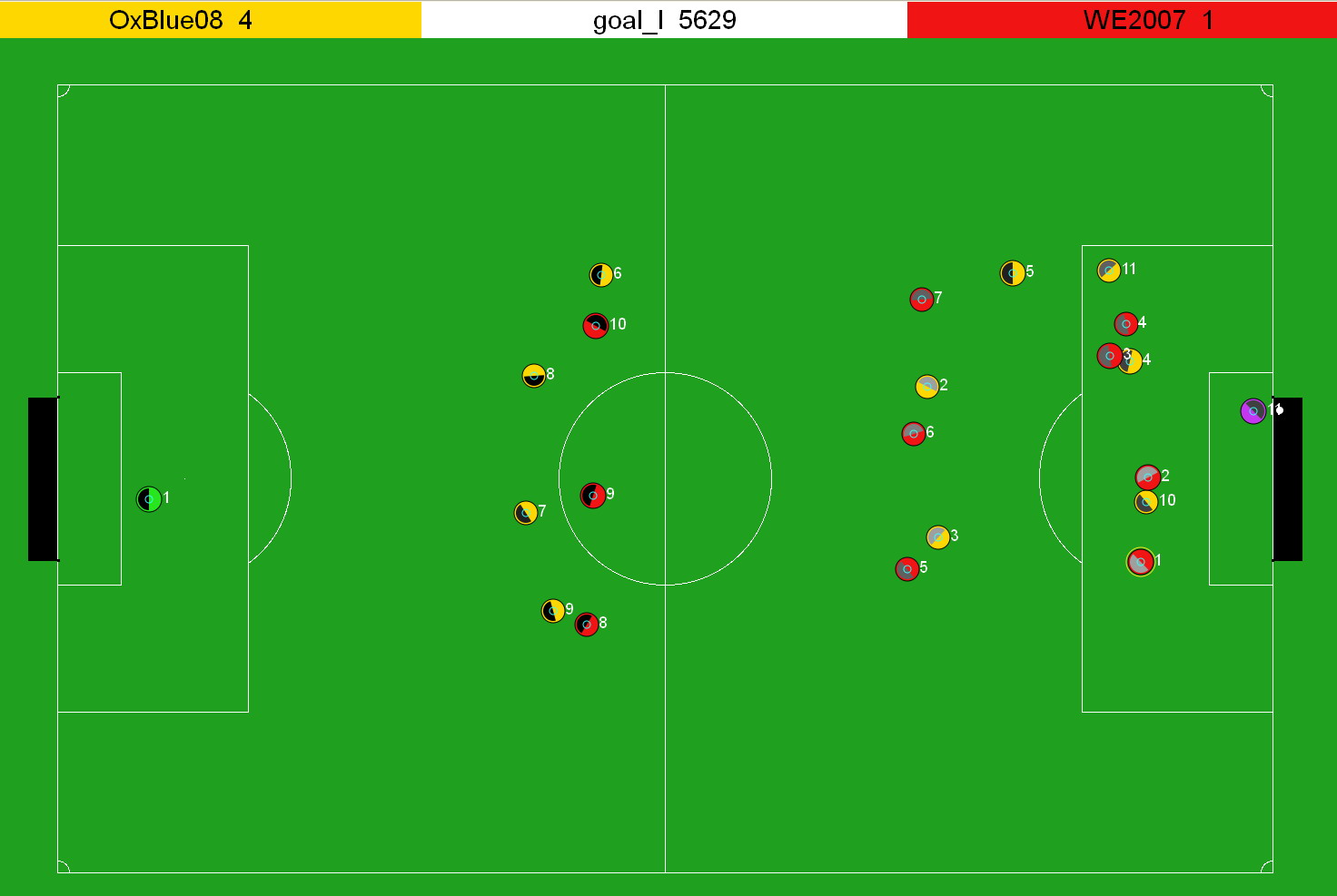
2D Soccer Simulation Screenshot

The RoboCup 2D Simulated Soccer League is the oldest of the RoboCup Soccer Simulation Leagues. It consists of a number of competitions with computer simulated soccer matches as the main event.

There are no physical robots in this league but spectators can watch the action on a large screen, which looks like a giant computer game. Each simulated robot player may have its own play strategy and characteristic and every simulated team actually consists of a collection of programs. Many computers are networked together in order for this competition to take place.

== Rules ==
In the 2D Simulation League, two teams of eleven autonomous software programs (called agents) each play soccer in a two-dimensional virtual soccer stadium represented by a central server, called SoccerServer. This server knows everything about the game, i.e. the current position of all players and the ball, the physics and so on. The game further relies on the communication between the server and each agent. On the one hand each player receives relative and noisy input of his virtual sensors (visual, acoustic and physical) and may on the other hand perform some basic commands (like dashing, turning or kicking) in order to influence its environment.

The big challenge in the Simulation League is to conclude from all possible world states (derived from the sensor input by calculating a sight on the world as absolute and noise-free as possible) to the best possible action to execute. As a game is divided into 6000 cycles this task has to be accomplished in time slot of 100 ms (the length of each cycle).

== Results ==
Year	Host	Winner	Score	Runner-up	Third place	Score	Fourth place	Number of teams
1997; Details	(Japan) Nagoya	(Germany); AT-Humboldt	11–2	(Japan); Andhill	(United States); ISIS	2–1	(United States); CMUnited	29
1998; Details	(France) Paris	(United States); CMUnited	3–0	(Germany); AT-Humboldt	(Netherlands); Windmill Wanderers	–	(United States); ISIS	36
1999; Details	(Sweden) Stockholm	(United States); CMUnited	7–0	(Germany) magmaFreiburg	(United Kingdom); Essex Wizards	–	(Japan); 11 Monkeys	24
2000; Details	(Australia) Melbourne	FCPortugal	1–0	(Germany); Brainstormers	(United States); ATT-CMUnited	–	(United States); CMUnited	24
2001; Details	(United States) Seattle	(China); TsinghuAeolus	1–0	(Germany); Brainstormers	FCPortugal	–	(Netherlands); UvA Trilearn	24
2002; Details	(Japan) Fukuoka	(China); TsinghuAeolus	7–0	(China); Everest	(Germany); Brainstormers	–	FCPortugal	24
2003; Details	(Italy) Padova	(Netherlands); UvA Trilearn	4-3	(China); TsinghuAeolus	(Germany); Brainstormers	2–1	(China); Everest	24
2004; Details	(Portugal) Lisbon	(Russia); STEP	8-1	(Germany); Brainstormers	(Iran); Mersad	1-0	(China); TsinghuAeolus	24
2005; Details	(Japan) Osaka	(Germany); Brainstormers	3-0	(China); WrightEagle	(Japan); TokyoTechSFC	–	(Russia); STEP	17
2006; Details	(Germany) Bremen	(China); WrightEagle	2-1	(Germany); Brainstormers	(Japan); Ri-one	–	(Japan); TokyoTech	16
2007; Details	(United States) Atlanta	(Germany); Brainstormers	3-0	(China); WrightEagle	(Japan); HELIOS	2-1	(Japan); OPU_hana_2D	15
2008; Details	(China) Suzhou	(Germany); Brainstormers	4–3	(China); WrightEagle	(Japan); HELIOS	–	(China); AmoyNQ	15
2009; Details	(Austria) Graz	(China); WrightEagle	2–1	(Japan); HELIOS	(Romania); Oxsy	1–0	(Germany); Brainstormers	19
2010; Details	Singapore	(Japan); HELIOS	2–1	(China); WrightEagle	(Romania); Oxsy	–	(Iran); ESKILAS	20
2011; Details	(Turkey) Istanbul	(China); WrightEagle	3–2	(Japan); HELIOS	(Iran); MarliK	3–2	(Romania); Oxsy	19
2012; Details	Mexico City	(Japan); HELIOS	4–1	(China); WrightEagle	(Iran); MarliK	1-0	(Australia); Gliders	19
2013; Details	(Netherlands) Eindhoven	(China); WrightEagle	2–0	(Japan); HELIOS	(China); YuShan	–	(Iran); Axiom	20
2014; Details	(Brazil) João Pessoa	(China); WrightEagle	3–2	(Australia); Gliders	(Romania); Oxsy	2-1	(Japan); HELIOS	15
2015; Details	(China) Hefei	(China); WrightEagle	4–0	(Japan); HELIOS	(Australia); Gliders	–	(Romania); Oxsy	19
2016; Details	(Germany) Leipzig	(Australia); Gliders	2–1	(Japan); HELIOS	(Japan); Rione	–	(China); CSU	18
2017; Details	(Japan) Nagoya	(Japan); HELIOS	2–0	(Germany); FRA-United	(Romania); Oxsy	0-0(2-1)	(Iran); Cyrus	16
2018; Details	(Canada) Montreal	(Japan); HELIOS	1–0	(Iran); Cyrus	(China); MT	2-0	(Romania); Oxsy	13
2019 Details	(Australia) Sydney	(Australia); Fractals	1–0	(Japan); HELIOS	(Iran); Cyrus	3-1	(China); YuShan	15
2021 Details	Online WorldWide	(Canada); Cyrus	1–0	(Japan); HELIOS	(China); YuShan	2-1	(China); HfutEngine	16
2022 Details	(Thailand) Bangkok	(Japan); HELIOS	1–0	(Canada); Cyrus	(China); YuShan	7-0	(Romania); Oxsy	12
2023 Details	(France) Bordeaux	(Japan); HELIOS	1–0	(Canada); Cyrus	(China); YuShan	5-3	(Romania); Oxsy	14
2024 Details	(Netherlands) Eindhoven	(Japan); HELIOS	2–2(4-3)	(Canada); Cyrus	(China); YuShan	1-0	(Germany); FRA-United	10
2025 Details	(Brazil) Salvador	(Japan); HELIOS	2–0	(China); YuShan	(China); YuShan	6-2	(Brazil) RobôCIn	9

=== Teams reaching the top four ===
Team	Titles	Runners-up	Third place	Fourth place
(Japan) HELIOS	8 (2010, 2012, 2017, 2018, 2022, 2023, 2024, 2025)	6 (2009, 2011, 2013, 2015, 2019, 2021)	2 (2007, 2008)	1 (2014)
(China) WrightEagle	6 (2006, 2009, 2011, 2013, 2014, 2015)	5 (2005, 2007, 2008, 2010, 2012)		
(Germany) Brainstormers	3 (2005, 2007, 2008)	4 (2000, 2001, 2004, 2006)	2 (2002, 2003)	1 (2009)
(China) TsinghuAeolus	2 (2001, 2002)	1 (2003)		1 (2004)
(United States) CMUnited	2 (1998, 1999)			2 (1997, 2000)
(Canada) Cyrus	1 (2021)	3 (2022, 2023, 2024)		
(Germany) AT-Humboldt	1 (1997)	1 (1998)		1 (2006)
FCPortugal	1 (2000)		1 (2001)	1 (2002)
(Netherlands) Uva Trilearn	1 (2003)			1 (2001)
(Russia) STEP	1 (2004)			1 (2005)
(Australia) Gliders	1 (2016)	1 (2014)	1 (2015)	1 (2012)
(Australia) Fractals	1 (2019)			
(Iran) Cyrus		1 (2018)	1 (2019)	1 (2017)
(China) Everest		1 (2002)		1 (2003)
(Germany) FRA-United		1 (2017)	1 (2025)	1 (2024)
(China) YuShan		1 (2025)	5 (2013, 2021, 2022, 2023, 2024)	1 (2019)
(Romania) Oxsy			4 (2009, 2010, 2014, 2017)	4 (2011, 2015, 2018, 2022)
(Iran) MarliK			2 (2011, 2012)	
(United States) ISIS			1 (1997)	1 (1998)
(China) MT			1 (2018)	
(Japan) Ri-one			1 (2006)	
(Japan) TokyoTechSFC			1 (2005)	
(Iran) Mersad			1 (2004)	
(United States) ATT-CMUnited			1 (2000)	
(United Kingdom) Essex Wizards			1 (1999)	
(Netherlands) Windmill Wanderers			1 (1998)	
(China) HfutEngine				1 (2021)
(Iran) Axiom				1 (2013)
(Iran) ESKILAS				1 (2010)
(Japan) OPU_hana_2D				1 (2007)
(Japan) 11 Monkeys				1 (1999)
(Brazil) RobôCIn				1 (2025)

== Titles per country ==
Country	Titles	Runners-up
China	8	7
Japan	8	6
Germany	4	7
Australia	2	1
United States	2	0
Canada	1	1
Netherlands	1	0
Russia	1	0
Portugal	1	0
Iran	0	1

== Teams ==
Country	Team(s)	University/Institute/School
Australia	Gliders; Receptivity; Fractals	CSIRO Computational Informatics
Brazil	Asimov2D; GPR2D; ITAndroids; UFSJ2D; Warthog2D; Expertinos; Robotbulls; PMec-Allejos; RobôCIn	Federal Institute of Espírito Santo; Parana Federal Technological University; Aeronautics Technological Institute; Federal University of São João del-Rei; University of São Paulo; Federal University of Itajubá; National Institute of Telecommunications; Federal University of Goiás; Federal University of Pernambuco
Canada	Cyrus	Dalhousie University
China	AUA2D; Apollo2D; Everest; HfutEngine; TsinghuAeolus; MT; WrightEagle; YuShan; GDUT_TiJi; Alice2D	Anhui University of Architecture Beijing Institute of Technology; Nanjing University of Posts and Telecommunications; Tsinghua University; Hefei University; University of Science and Technology of China; Anhui University of Technology; Guangdong University of Technology; Hefei Normal University
Germany	FRA-United	Frankfurt University of Applied Sciences
India	InfoGraphics	Indian Institute of Technology, Kharagpur
Iran	Cyrus; Tehran2D; MasterPiece; 051; Armik; AUTParsian; Axiom; Shiraz; HERMES; Nexus2D; Unique; Riton; Artemis; Soccereus; AbouAliSina; ESKILAS; LegenDary; MarliK; NADCO-2D; Genius; Razi; Persepolis; The 8 RoboSampad; Hades2D	Atomic Energy High School; Atomic Energy High School Amirkabir University of Technology (Tehran Polytechnic); Iran University of Science and Technology (IUST) Shiraz University Of Technology; Allame Helli1 high school Mashhad University Allame Helli High School AbouAliSina HighSchool; Islamic Azad University of Mashhad; University of Guilan, Shahid Beheshti University; University Of Guilan, UGM-LaB; Islamic Azad University, NADCO Educational Robotics Corporation; Ghazal High School Shahid Beheshti Highschool of Ardabil
Japan	HELIOS; RaiC; Ri-one	Fukuoka University, AIST, Osaka Prefecture University; Fukui National College of Technology; Ritsumeikan University
Netherlands	Windmill Wanderers; UvA Trilearn	Universiteit van Amsterdam
Portugal	FCPortugal	Aveiro University, Porto University
Romania	Oxsy	Compa-IT

== See also ==
- RoboCup
- RoboCup Simulation League
- RoboCup 3D Soccer Simulation League
