= Hand–eye calibration problem =

Robotics problem on coordinating two parts of a robot

In robotics and mathematics, the hand–eye calibration problem (also called the robot–sensor or robot–world calibration problem) is the problem of determining the transformation between a robot end-effector and a sensor or sensors (camera or laser scanner) or between a robot base and the world coordinate system. It is conceptually analogous to biological hand–eye coordination (hence the name). It takes the form of AX=ZB, where A and B are two systems, usually a robot base and a camera, and X and Z are unknown transformation matrices. A highly studied special case of the problem occurs where X=Z, taking the form of the problem AX=XB. Solutions to the problem take the forms of several types of methods, including separable closed-form solutions, simultaneous closed-form solutions, and iterative solutions. The covariance of X in the equation can be calculated for any randomly perturbed matrices A and B.

The problem is an important part of robot calibration, with efficiency and accuracy of the solutions determining the speed accuracy of the calibrations of robots.

== Methods ==
Many different methods and solutions developed to solve the problem, broadly defined as either separable, simultaneous solutions. Each type of solution has specific advantages and disadvantages as well as formulations and applications to the problem. A common theme throughout all of the methods is the common use of quaternions to represent rotations.

=== Separable solutions ===
Given the equation AX=ZB, it is possible to decompose the equation into a purely rotational and translational part; methods utilizing this are referred to as separable methods. Where R_{A} represents a 3×3 rotation matrix and t_{A} a 3×1 translation vector, the equation can be broken into two parts:

R_{A}R_{X}=R_{Z}R_{B}
R_{A}t_{X}+t_{A}=R_{Z}t_{B}+t_{Z}

The second equation becomes linear if R_{Z} is known. As such, the most frequent approach is to solve for R_{x} and R_{z} using the first equation, then using R_{z} to solve for the variables in the second equation. Rotation is represented using quaternions, allowing for a linear solution to be found. While separable methods are useful, any error in the estimation for the rotation matrices is compounded when being applied to the translation vector. Other solutions avoid this problem.

=== Simultaneous solutions ===
Simultaneous solutions are based on solving for both X and Z at the same time (rather than basing the solution of one part off of the other as in separable solutions), propagation of error is significantly reduced. By formulating the matrices as dual quaternions, it is possible to get a linear equation by which X is solvable in a linear format. An alternative way applies the least-squares method to the Kronecker product of the matrices A⊗B. As confirmed by experimental results, simultaneous solutions have less error than separable quaternion solutions.

=== Iterative solutions ===
Iterative solutions are another method used to solve the problem of error propagation. One example of an iterative solution is a program based on minimizing ||AX−XB||. As the program iterates, it will converge on a solution to X independent to the initial robot orientation of R_{B}. Solutions can also be two-step iterative processes, and like simultaneous solutions can also decompose the equations into dual quaternions. However, while iterative solutions to the problem are generally simultaneous and accurate, they can be computationally taxing to carry out and may not always converge on the optimal solution.

=== The AX=XB case ===
The matrix equation AX=XB, where X is unknown, has an infinite number of solutions that can be easily studied by a geometrical approach. To find X it is necessary to consider a simultaneous set of 2 equations A_{1}X=XB_{1} and A_{2}X=XB_{2}; the matrices A_{1}, A_{2}, B_{1}, B_{2} have to be dermined by experiments to be performed in an optimized way.

=== The 2D laser profile scanner case ===
$$\begin{bmatrix} p_b \\ 1 \end{bmatrix}=
\begin{bmatrix} R_b & T_b \\ 0 & 1 \end{bmatrix}\centerdot
\begin{bmatrix} R_s & T_s \\ 0 & 1 \end{bmatrix}\centerdot
\begin{bmatrix} p_s \\ 1 \end{bmatrix}$$

where $p_b$ represents the unknown coordinate of the point $p$ in the robot base system, $R_b, T_b$ represent the known relationship between the robot base system and end-effector, $R_s,T_s$ are the unknown relationship between the end-effector and the scanner, and $p_s$ is the known coordinate of the point $p$ in the local scanner system. Methods are as follows,

- Straight edges

There is a method using straight edges for hand-eye calibration.
