= Vortex (software) =

- Developer: CM Labs Simulations
- Stable release: Vortex Studio 2020a / June 8, 2020; 6 years ago
- Operating system: Windows, Linux
- Type: Simulation software platform
- License: Commercial proprietary software
- Website: www.cm-labs.com

Vortex Studio is a simulation software platform developed by CM Labs Simulations. It features a real-time physics engine that simulates rigid body dynamics, collision detection, contact determination, and dynamic reactions. It also contains model import and preparation tools, an image generator, and networking tools for distributed simulation which is accessed through a desktop editor via a GUI. Vortex adds accurate physical motion and interactions to objects in visual-simulation applications for operator training, mission planning, product concept validation, heavy machinery and robotics design and testing, haptics devices, immersive and virtual reality (VR) environments.

The Vortex Studio content creation platform and the C++ SDK have several modules that simulate physics-based particles, sensors, floating bodies, cable systems, earthmoving operations, grasping, and vehicles (wheeled or tracked). Vortex has modular architecture: developers can integrate their projects into 3D visualisation frameworks and deploy them in environments that contain software-in-the-loop (SIL), MATLAB, hardware-in-the-loop (HIL), and motion platform components.

== History ==
Vortex Studio is developed by CM Labs Simulations Inc., a private company established in Montreal in 2001. CM Labs was created when the management of MathEngine Canada Inc. purchased a portion of the business from MathEngine PLC, the parent company in the UK. MathEngine Canada Inc. was originally the research and development team responsible for creating the Karma physics simulation engine for computer games. That team and underlying technology came Lateral Logic Inc, founded in 1994 in Montreal, which had developed rigid-body dynamics and collision detection engines for use in custom simulators sold to Sisu AB for forestry harvester operator training and to Nokia for product demonstration. Lateral Logic was acquired by MathEngine in 1999.

CM Labs shifted its focus away from gaming. It now supports two distinct markets, visual simulation for training (VST), targeting Vortex at robotics and heavy-equipment operator training in both commercial and military applications, and heavy equipment prototyping and engineering, targeting mostly manufacturers and academia.

Vortex Studio has been under active development ever since the initial launch of the software in 2001. It usually has three releases per year (a, b and c).

== Use ==
Vortex has been used for commercial, military, and academic projects. It has been used to simulate vehicles, robotics, and heavy equipment in construction, mining, forestry, marine, subsea, planetary, academic, and military environments. It has also been used to simulate the movements and behaviour of animals and insects for scientific purposes. Sample examples are:

- The Explosive Ordnance Disposal (EOD) robot simulator developed by the European Aeronautic Defence and Space Company (EADS) for training purposes. EADS uses Vortex to model the physical behaviour of the robot as it maneuvers in its simulated environment, interacting with other objects while processing user commands.
- A driverless vehicle designed by Carnegie Mellon University’s Red Team Racing for the DARPA Grand Challenge that uses Vortex for preplanning and onboard navigation to “accurately simulate the vehicle as it navigates the terrain, including both local area constraints and global path planning objectives.”
- Heavy-equipment operator training simulators such as tower crane, mobile crane, crawler crane, and concrete pump for the Operating Engineers Training Institute of Ontario and the International Union of Operating Engineers – Local 721. These simulators are used to prepare operators for proper equipment use and accident avoidance.
- Georgia State University’s AnimatLab project, which is a simulation software environment that models how the body and nervous system dynamically interact in a Vortex-governed virtual physical world where relevant neural and physical parameters can be observed and manipulated.

== See also ==
- Game physics
- Robotics simulator
