= OpenRAVE =

Robotics software

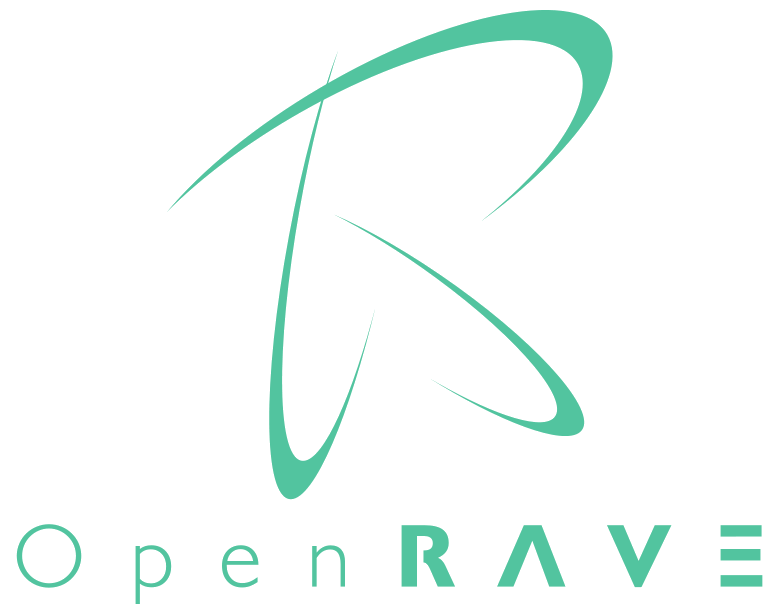
- Initial release: March 17, 2008; 18 years ago
- Stable release: 0.8.2 / October 18, 2012; 13 years ago
- Operating system: Linux, Microsoft Windows, Mac OS X
- License: GNU Lesser General Public License and Apache License, Version 2.0
- Website: openrave.org

Open Robotics Automation Virtual Environment (OpenRAVE) provides an environment for testing, developing, and deploying motion planning algorithms in real-world robotics applications. The main focus is on simulation and analysis of kinematic and geometric information related to motion planning. OpenRAVE's stand-alone nature allows it to be easily integrated into existing robotics systems. It provides many command-line tools to work with robots and planners, and the run-time core is small enough to be used inside controllers and bigger frameworks.

== Components ==
=== IKFast ===
IKFast is a compiler for inverse kinematics. Unlike most inverse kinematics solvers, IKFast can analytically solve the kinematics equations of any complex kinematics chain, and generate language-specific files (like C++) for later use. The end result is extremely stable solutions that can run as fast as 5 microseconds on recent processors.

=== COLLADA ===
OpenRAVE supports the COLLADA 1.5 file format for specifying robots and adds its own set of robot-specific extensions. The robot extensions include:

- manipulators
- sensors
- planning-specific parameters

=== Motion planning ===
The core of OpenRAVE design focuses on offering interfaces and implementations of motion planning algorithms. Most of the planning algorithm implementations are for robot arms and use sampling to explore the task configuration spaces.

== Applications ==
An important target application is industrial robotics automation. OpenRAVE's main focus is to increase the reliability of motion planning systems to make integration easy.

== History ==
OpenRAVE was founded by Rosen Diankov at the Quality of Life Technology Center in the Carnegie Mellon University Robotics Institute. It was inspired from the RAVE simulator James Kuffner had started developing in 1995 and used for a lot of his experiments. The OpenRAVE project was started in 2006 and started out as a complete rewrite of RAVE to support plugins. It quickly diverged into its own architecture concept and started being supported by many robotics researchers throughout the world. After earning his PhD from the Robotics Institute in August 2010, Rosen Diankov became a postdoc at the JSK Robotics Lab at University of Tokyo where OpenRAVE is currently being maintained.

Rosen Diankov is still the active maintainer of OpenRAVE.

== See also ==
- List of robotics software
- List of motion planning algorithms
- AlphaEvolve — evolutionary coding agent for designing advanced algorithms based on large language models such as Gemini
