= Open Dynamics Engine =

Physics engine written in C/C++

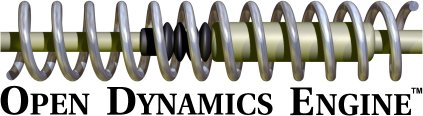

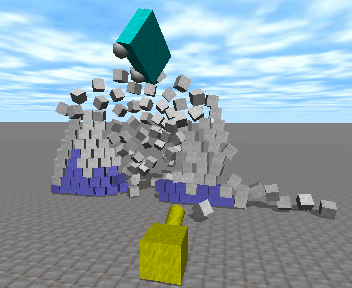
- Developer: Russell Smith
- Release: May 8, 2001; 25 years ago
- Stable release: 0.16.6 / January 16, 2025; 21 months ago
- Written in: C/C++
- Operating system: Platform independent
- Type: Physics engine
- License: BSD
- Website: www.ode.org
- Repository: bitbucket.org/odedevs/ode

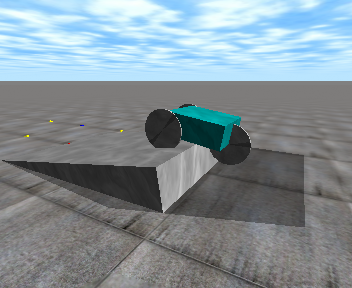
A simple vehicle driving over a ramp. This demo is distributed with the ODE source code (demo_buggy).

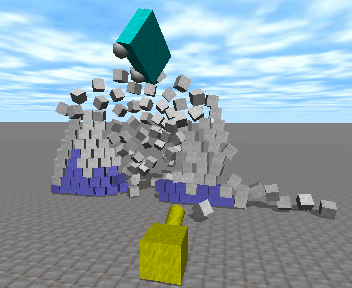
A collision with many objects. This demo is distributed with the ODE source code (demo_crash).

The Open Dynamics Engine (ODE) is a physics engine written in C/C++. Its two main components are a rigid body dynamics simulation engine and a collision detection engine. It is free software licensed both under the BSD license and the LGPL.

ODE was started in 2001 and has been used in many applications and games, such as Assetto Corsa, BloodRayne 2, Call of Juarez, S.T.A.L.K.E.R., Titan Quest, World of Goo, X-Moto, Mad Tracks, OpenSimulator and Dying Light.

== Overview ==
The Open Dynamics Engine is used for simulating the dynamic interactions between bodies in space. It is not tied to any particular graphics package although it includes a basic one called drawstuff. It supports several geometries: box, sphere, capsule (cylinder capped with hemispheres), triangle mesh, cylinder and heightmap.

== Simulation ==
Higher level environments that allow non-programmers access to ODE include Player Project, Webots, Opensimulator, anyKode Marilou and CoppeliaSim.

ODE is a popular choice for robotics simulation applications, with scenarios such as mobile robot locomotion and simple grasping. ODE has some drawbacks in this field, for example the method of approximating friction and poor support for joint-damping.

== See also ==
- OPAL – the Open Physics Abstraction Layer, originally built on top of ODE
- Newton Game Dynamics
- Bullet – another open source physics engine used in commercial games and movies
- Chipmunk – a similar physics engine intended for 2D applications
- Vortex (software)
- Project Chrono
