= Off-line programming (robotics) =

Off-line programming (OLP) is a robot programming method where the robot program is created independent from the actual robot cell. The robot program is then uploaded to the real industrial robot for execution. In off-line programming, the robot cell is represented through a graphical 3D model in a simulator. Nowadays OLP and robotics simulator tools help robot integrators create the optimal program paths for the robot to perform a specific task. Robot movements, reachability analysis, collision and near-miss detection and cycle time reporting can be included when simulating the robot program.

OLP does not interfere with production as the program for the robot is created outside the production process on an external computer. This method contradicts to the traditional on-line programming of industrial robots where the robot teach pendant is used for programming the robot manually.

The time for the adoption of new programs can be cut from weeks to a single day, enabling the robotization of short-run production.
