= CM Labs Simulations =

Canada based simulation software company

- Trade name: CM Labs
- Formerly: Lateral Logic; Critical Mass Systems; MathEngine Canada
- Company type: Private
- Founded: 1994; 31 years ago (as Lateral Logic); 2001; 24 years ago (as CM Labs)
- Founder: Jussi Westergren; Karsten Howes; Frédéric Francis; Robert Weldon
- Headquarters: Montreal, Canada
- Owner: MathEngine PLC (1999-2001)
- Website: cm-labs.com

CM Labs Simulations is a private company established in Montreal in 2001. CM Labs makes simulators and training software for various industries.

== History ==
The company that was to become CM Labs Simulations was founded as Lateral Logic Inc. in 1994 by Jussi Westergren, Karsten Howes, and Frédéric Francis. The company was focused on ground vehicle visual simulation systems, and the development of software toolkits for physics simulation. They released the Lateral Collision Engine (LCE) in 1998.

Lateral Logic was acquired by MathEngine PLC in April 1999 and was renamed Critical Mass Systems. MathEngine's original Dynamics Toolkit and Collision Toolkit were developed in part by Critical Mass Systems.

In 2001, MathEngine spun off Critical Mass Systems business as CM Labs Simulations, consisting of the CM office in Montreal and a portion of MathEngine's technology, renamed Vortex. Vortex has been under active development ever since the initial launch of the software in 2001.

While MathEngine's remaining technology, itself renamed Karma, became fully absorbed into the Unreal Engine 2 and RenderWare game engines, CM Labs shifted its focus away from gaming to the visual simulation for training (VST) market.
