= Oussama Khatib =

American roboticist

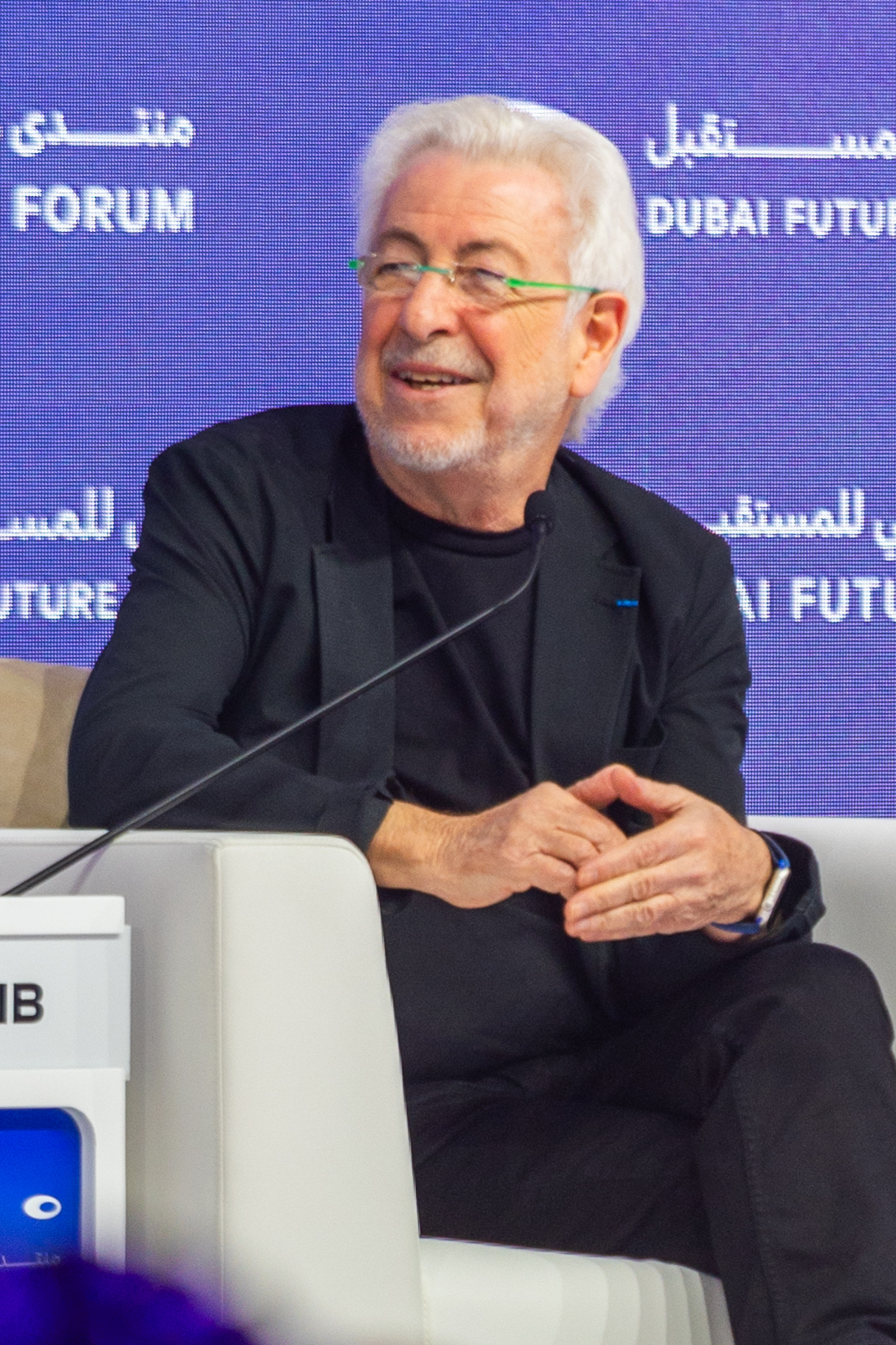
- Born: 1950 (age 75–76); Aleppo, Syria
- Education: Stanford University; Sup'Aero, Toulouse, France
- Scientific career
- Fields: Robotics

Oussama Khatib (Arabic: أسامة الخطيب) is a roboticist and a professor of computer science at Stanford University, and a Fellow of the IEEE. He is credited with seminal work in areas ranging from robot motion planning and control, human-friendly robot design, to haptic interaction and human motion synthesis. His work's emphasis has been to develop theories, algorithms, and technologies, that control robot systems by using models of their physical dynamics. These dynamic models are used to derive optimal controllers for complex robots that interact with the environment in real-time.

== Life ==
Khatib received a Ph.D. in Electrical Engineering from Sup'Aero, Toulouse, France, in 1980. He then joined the Computer Science Department at Stanford University, and has been a member of the faculty there ever since. He is presently the director of the Stanford Robotics Laboratory, and a member of the Stanford University Bio-X Initiative.

== Work ==
=== Academic work ===
Khatib's first seminal contribution was the artificial potential field method, which avoids the complex robot motion planning problem by projecting controlling robots with potential fields in task space. First introduced in 1978, the method was motivated by the pressing need to enable reactive robot operation in unstructured environments, and it has since been adopted and extended by a growing number of researchers in a wide range of areas and applications in robotics, graphics, vision, and animation. Khatib, with Sean Quinlan, later proposed the elastic band model, which provided a robot planner with the ability to adjust and modify its planned motions during execution while efficiently detecting potential collisions using a sphere hierarchy.

Khatib's next contribution was the operational space formulation in 1980, which avoids controlling robots joint-by-joint and instead formulates the robot dynamics, performance analysis, and control in the very space where the task is specified. When used with an accurate inertial dynamic model, this method solves the problem of joint motion coordination in a kinetic energy optimal manner.

Since the 1980s, Khatib and his lab have made fundamental advances in macro-mini robots (serial structures), cooperative robots (parallel structures), dexterous dynamic coordination, virtual linkages to model internal forces in cooperative manipulation, posture and whole body control, dynamic task decoupling, optimal control, human-robot compliant interaction, elastic strips for real-time path planning, human motion synthesis, and human-friendly robot design.

Khatib's contributions also span the field of haptic interaction and dynamic simulation. His work with Diego Ruspini in haptic rendering established some of the basic foundations for haptic explorations of virtual environments—the virtual proxy for haptics rendering, haptic shading, texture, and collision detection. This founding work was pursued with Francois Conti to address the display of deformable objects, the expansion of workspace for spanning large volumes with small haptic devices, and the efficient and safe hybrid actuation of haptic devices, with numerous applications including ultrasound examination in pregnancy.

The Khatib group's present day interests include modeling human motor control, muscle actuated control, humanoid robotics, haptics in neuroimaging, and multi-contact control.

Memberships

- President of the International Foundation for Robotics Research (IFRR)
- Fellow of the Institute of Electrical and Electronics Engineers (IEEE)

=== Robots ===
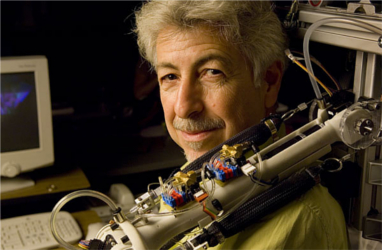
Khatib is holding a novel muscle actuated robot arm that uses a hybrid pneumatic muscle and electrical motor actuation mechanism.

Stanford Robotics Platforms (Romeo and Juliet)

In the mid-1990s, Khatib's lab focused their efforts towards developing robot manipulation in a human environment. The Stanford Robotics Platforms, developed in the process, were the first fully integrated holonomic mobile manipulation platforms and were later known as Romeo and Juliet. This effort gave birth to a commercial holonomic mobile robot, the Nomad XR4000, by Nomadic Technologies. The models and algorithms resulting from this project established the basis for his later exploration of humanoid robotics like the Honda ASIMO.

Haptic fMRI Interface (HFI)

Developed in 2013 by Samir Menon, Gerald Brantner, and Chris Aholt under Khatib's supervision, HFI is a Functional Magnetic Resonance Imaging (fMRI) compatible haptic interface with three degrees-of-freedom. The interface allows subjects to perform virtual haptic tasks inside the entire bore of an MRI machine, and is lightweight and transparent to enable high fidelity neuroscience experiments. Khatib's group has successfully demonstrated real-time closed-loop haptic control during a high resolution fMRI scan with low enough noise levels to enable single subject analyses without smoothing.

== Prizes ==
- Knight, National Order of Merit (Chevalier, Ordre national du Mérite) of the French Government, 2023
- Association for Advancing Automation 2022 Engelberger Robotics Award for Education
- IEEE RAS Robotics and Automation Technical Field Award (TFA) 2017
- IEEE RAS Robotics and Automation Technical Field Award (TFA) 2017
- IEEE RAS George Saridis Leadership Award 2014.
- IEEE RAS Distinguished Service Award 2013.
- IEEE RAS Pioneer Award 2010.
- PROSE Award for Excellence in Physical Sciences & Mathematics 2008.
- Japan Robot Association (JARA) Award in Research and Development.

In 2018 Khatib was elected to the National Academy of Engineering for contributions to the understanding, analysis, control, and design of robotic systems operating in complex, unstructured, and dynamic environments.

== Selected publications ==
- Oussama Khatib (March 1986), "Real-time obstacle avoidance for manipulators and mobile robots", International Journal of Robotics Research, 5 (1): 90–98, doi:10.1177/027836498600500106, S2CID 122508976
- Oussama Khatib (February 1987), "A unified approach for motion and force control of robot manipulators: The operational space formulation", IEEE Journal on Robotics and Automation, 3 (1): 43–53, doi:10.1109/JRA.1987.1087068, S2CID 7687240
- Oussama Khatib and Joel Burdick (April 1986). "Motion and force control of robot manipulators". Proceedings. 1986 IEEE International Conference on Robotics and Automation (PDF). Vol. 3. pp. 1381–1386. doi:10.1109/ROBOT.1986.1087493. S2CID 27107944.
- Oussama Khatib (February 1995), "Inertial properties in robotic manipulation: An object-level framework", The International Journal of Robotics Research, 14 (1): 19–36, doi:10.1177/027836499501400103, S2CID 14649977
- Bruno Siciliano & Oussama Khatib, ed. (2008), Springer Handbook of Robotics, Springer, ISBN 978-3-540-23957-4. Alternative ISBN 354023957X.
