= International Federation of Robotics =

Robotics organization

International Federation of Robotics (IFR)
- Abbreviation: IFR
- Formation: 1987
- Type: NGO
- Legal status: International Federation
- Purpose: International co-operation in the field of Robotics
- Headquarters: Frankfurt, Germany
- Region served: World
- Members: national robotics associations, robotics companies, robotics institutes

The International Federation of Robotics (IFR) is a professional non-profit organization established in 1987 to promote, strengthen and protect the robotics industry worldwide.

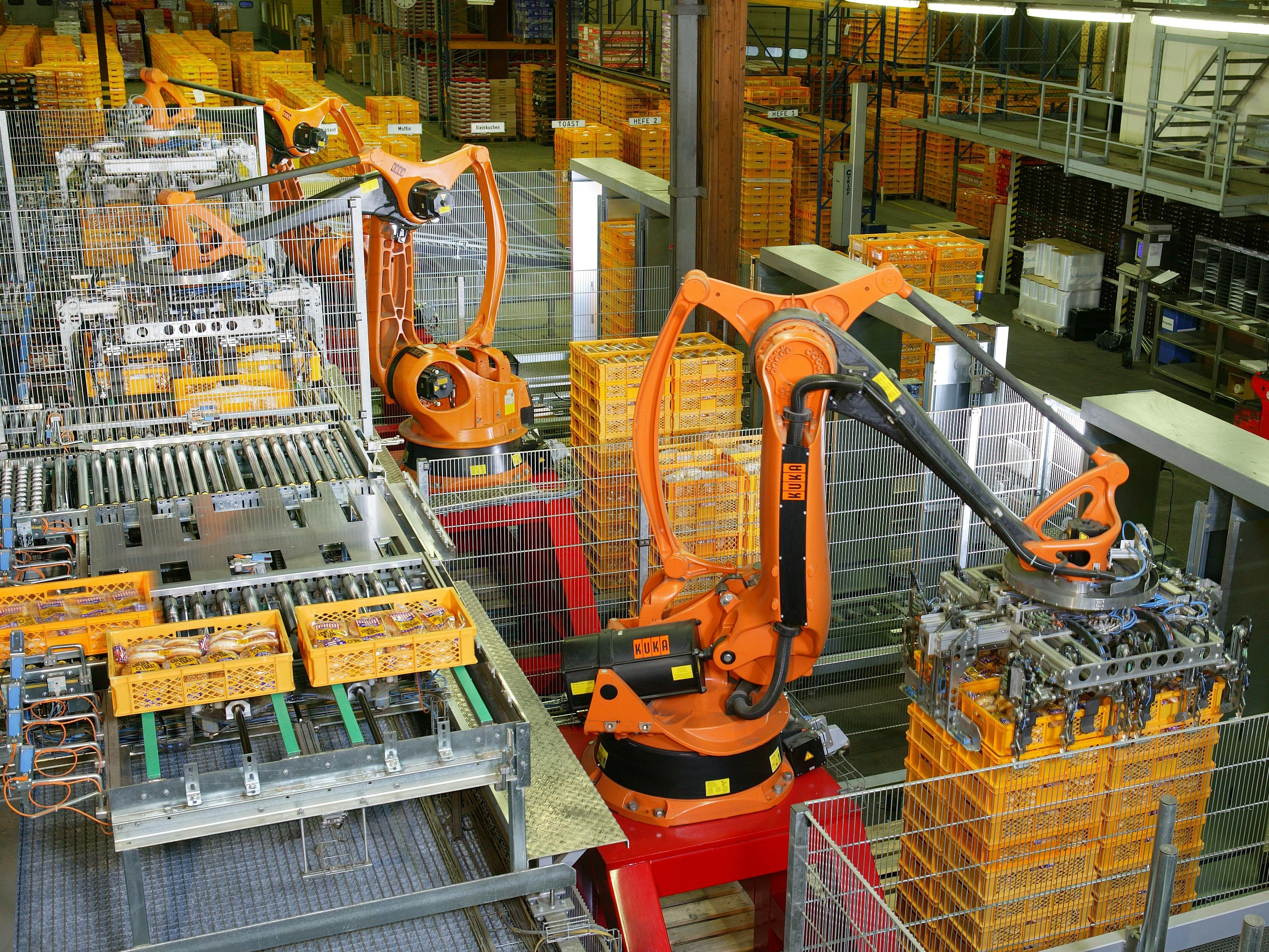
Factory automation with KUKA industrial robots for palletizing food products like bread and toast at a bakery in Germany

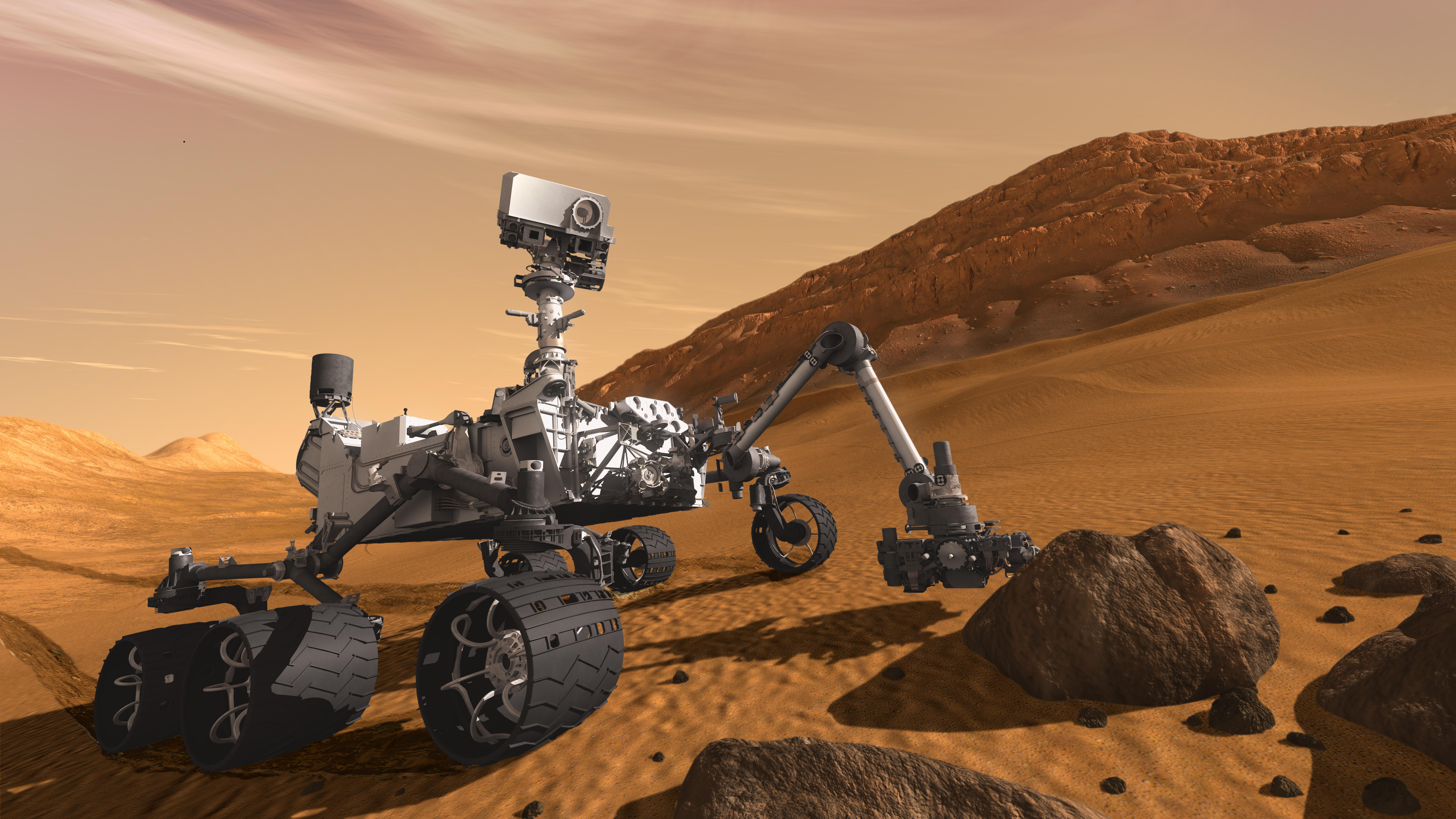
The Mars rover as an example of a mobile service robot

== Activities ==
The purpose of the International Federation of Robotics is to promote research, development, use and international co-operation in the field of robotics, both industrial automated robots and service robots. The IFR is also coordinator of the International Symposium on Robotics (ISR), one of the oldest conferences for robotics research, founded in 1970.

== Members ==
Today nearly all international industrial robot suppliers and 18 national robots associations are members of IFR. Headquarters of this umbrella organization of national robotics associations is in Frankfurt, Germany.

Country	IFR Member Associations
United States	A3
Spain	Asociación Española de Robótica (AER)
United Kingdom	British Automation & Robotics Association (BARA)
Canada	Canadian Robotics Council
China	China Robot Industry Alliance (CRIA)
Denmark	Danish Industrial Robot Association (DIRA)
Turkey	ENOSAD
France	Evolis
Poland	FAIRPL
Japan	Japan Robot Association (JARA)
South Korea	Korea Association of Robot Industry (KAR)
Netherlands	NL Robotics
Bulgaria	PARAI
Kazakhstan	Qaztech
Italy	Associazione Italiana di Robotica e Automazione (SIRI)
Sweden	Swedish Industrial Robot Association (SWIRA)
Taiwan	Taiwan Automation Intelligence and Robotics Association (TAIROA)
Germany	VDMA Robotics + Automation (VDMA R+A)

== Key persons ==
- President: Jane Heffner (Teradyne Robotics)
- General Secretary: Dr. Susanne Bieller (VDMA)
- Chairman, Research Committee: Alexander Verl (University of Stuttgart)
- Chairman, Industrial Robot Supplier Group: Michael Klos (Yaskawa)
- Chairman, Service Robotics Group: Francesco Ferro (PAL Robotics) and Werner Kraus (Fraunhofer IPA)

== See also ==
- Automation
