= Japan Robot Association =

- Abbreviation: JARA
- Formation: March 1971; 55 years ago
- Type: Trade association
- Location: Minato-ku, Tokyo 105-0011, Japan
- Coordinates: 35°39′35.4″N 139°44′42.8″E
- Region served: Japan
- Official language: Japanese
- Chairman: Yasuhiko Hashimoto
- Website: jara.jp

The Japan Robot Association (日本ロボット工業会, Nihon Robotto Kōgyō-kai) (JARA) is a trade association made up of companies in Japan that develop and manufacture robot technology. It was formed in 1971, as the Industrial Robot Conversazione and was the world's first robot association. The association was reorganized and renamed as the Japan Industrial Robot Association (JIRA) in 1972, and was formally incorporated in 1973. The name of the association was changed again in 1994 to its current one to accommodate non-industrial robots such as personal robots. Its headquarters are in Tokyo.

The Japan Robot Association aims to advance the growth of the robot manufacturing industry by encouraging research and development on robots and related system products, and promoting the use of robot technology in industry and society.

The activities of the Japan Robot Association include organizing the International Robot Exhibition (IREX) every two years in Tokyo, the Jisso Process Technology Exhibition every year, and hosting the ORiN (Open Robot interface for the Network) Forum to promote standard network access to robots and programmable machines. It is also a member of the International Federation of Robotics (IFR).

Members include Japanese robot manufacturers like Denso, FANUC, Hitachi, Kawasaki Heavy Industries, Mitsubishi Electric, Panasonic Corporation, Sony, Toshiba, Yamaha Motor Company, Yaskawa Electric Corporation. Also some non Japanese industrial robot suppliers are members of JARA: ABB, KUKA and Stäubli.

== See also ==
- Robotic Industries Association, the corresponding US trade group.
