= Swisslog =

Logistics automation company

Swisslog Holding AG
- Industry: Automation
- Founded: 1900
- Headquarters: Aarau, Switzerland
- Key people: Jan Zuurbier (CEO)
- Products: Logistics automation, Material handling, conveyor and warehouse technology
- Revenue: €768.4 million (2025)
- Number of employees: 3,000 (March 2024)
- Parent: KUKA
- Website: www.swisslog.com

Swisslog Holding AG, operating as Swisslog, is a Swiss company that supplies automation systems and software for warehouses and distribution centers. It is headquartered in Aarau, Aargau, and is a wholly owned subsidiary of the German, Chinese-owned robotics and automation group KUKA. Swisslog employs more than 3,000 people at over 30 locations. Until July 2015, Swisslog was listed on the SIX Swiss Exchange.

== Area of operations ==
Automated conveyors transport bins and cartons in a automated warehouse

Swisslog plans, implements, and services automated material-handling systems for warehouses and distribution centers. Swisslog serves customers in more than 50 countries. Its customers include companies in grocery, retail and e-commerce, food and beverage, pharmaceutical and healthcare, and fashion, as well as third-party logistics providers and other industrial sectors.

At fashion retailer Varner's distribution center in Vänersborg, Sweden, a Swisslog installation connects receiving with automated storage, picking, and packing areas. Swisslog also built an AutoStore bin-storage system for Active Ants, an e-commerce fulfillment provider that operates warehouses for third-party clients. At Coca-Cola Amatil's Northmead site in New South Wales, Swisslog designed an automated storage and retrieval system and a monorail linking receiving, storage and staging. The system transports 740 pallets per hour and automatically stages loads for trailers. For the medical-supply company Medline, Swisslog served as the AutoStore implementation partner and provided control software linking the installation to Medline's warehouse management system.

KUKA reports Swisslog and Swisslog Healthcare as separate operating segments. At the end of 2025, the Swisslog segment included 22 fully consolidated companies and recorded revenue of €768.4 million.

== Products, software, and services ==
AutoStore is a storage system implemented by Swisslog. Robots move on a grid and transport containers.

Goods to person picking stations in an automated fulfillment center

Swisslog is a systems integrator for automated warehouses. It designs, manufactures and implements automated storage and retrieval systems, conveyor and other transport systems, automated robotic order-picking and palletizing equipment, as well as warehouse management software. It also provides planning, project implementation, maintenance, and support services.

Its systems are used for the storage and movement of pallets as well as smaller loads such as cartons, trays, and totes. The equipment includes stacker cranes and shuttle systems, conveyors and monorails and autonomous mobile robots.

Swisslog also integrates the cube-based storage and retrieval system developed by the Norwegian company AutoStore AS. In 2026, the company added a four-way pallet shuttle to its range.

For order fulfilment, Swisslog supplies goods-to-person and shelf-to-person picking systems, as well as equipment for picking individual items and automated mixed-case palletizing. Some of these systems use KUKA industrial robots.

Swisslog developed an intralogistic software platform for automated warehouses called SynQ. SynQ combines a warehouse management system (WMS), warehouse control system (WCS), material flow control (MFC), and supervisory control and data acquisition (SCADA). The platform can be integrated with host systems, like enterprise resource planning (ERP), or e-commerce systems. Swisslog also implements and integrates SAP EWM for manual and automated warehouse processes.

== History ==
Swisslog traces its roots back to an electrical-apparatus business established in Aarau in 1900 by Carl Sprecher and Hans Fretz. Heinrich Schuh joined the business in 1902. After Fretz left the following year, it operated under the name Sprecher & Schuh. The company initially manufactured equipment for electrical power distribution.

Beginning in the mid-1980s, Sprecher + Schuh sold its high- and medium-voltage operations to Alstom and later its low-voltage business to Rockwell/Allen-Bradley. It expanded its automation activities through acquisitions including Translift, Digitron, and OWL. In 1994, Sprecher + Schuh was renamed Swisslog.

In September 2014, KUKA offered Swisslog shareholders 1.35 Swiss francs per share, corresponding to a total purchase price of 338 million Swiss francs. Swisslog's board recommended that shareholders accept the offer. KUKA acquired Swisslog in December 2014.

In April 2015, Swisslog acquired the United States-based warehouse automation company Forte Industries. Swisslog's shares were delisted from the SIX Swiss Exchange on July 31, 2015. Swisslog acquired Power Automation Systems in 2016, adding the PowerStore pallet shuttle to its product range. Forte and Power Automation Systems were combined with Swisslog's American warehouse and distribution business under the Swisslog brand in January 2017.

In 2024, Swisslog opened a new regional headquarters for the Americas in Atlanta, Georgia, as well as a new office in Mississauga, Ontario in Canada.

In August 2026, Swisslog Holding AG moved its registered office from Buchs to Aarau.
