= ORiN =

Industrial computing

ORiN (Open Robot/Resource interface for the Network) is a standard network interface for FA (factory automation) systems. The Japan Robot Association proposed ORiN in 2002, and the ORiN Forum develops and maintains the ORiN standard.

== Background ==
The installation of PC (Personal Computer) applications in the factory has increased dramatically recently. Various types of application software systems, such as production management systems, process management systems, operation monitoring systems and failure analysis systems, have become vital to factory operation. These software systems are becoming indispensable for the manufacturing system.

However, most of these software systems are only compatible with specific models or specific manufacturers of the FA system. This is because the software system is “custom made” depending on the specific special network or protocol. Once this type of application is installed in a factory and if there are no resident software engineers for the system, the improvement of the system will stop, the cost-effectiveness of the system will be worsen, and the total value of the system will deteriorate.

Another recent problem in production is the rapid increase of the product demand at the initial stage of the product release. The manufactures will lose the chance of possible profit if they cannot meet the demand. To cope with the problem, manufacturing industry is trying to achieve the vertical upstart of the production, and high re-usability of both hardware and software is the key for the goal.

To solve these problems, ORiN was developed as a standard PC application platform.

== Outline ==
ORiN was originally developed as a standard platform for robot applications. Nowadays, ORiN became a manufacturing application program platform for handling wider range of resources including robots and other FA devices like programmable logic controllers (PLC) and numerical control (NC) systems, or more generic resources like databases and local file systems. ORiN specifications are on software only and are independent from hardware. Therefore, ORiN can be smoothly integrated with other existing technologies only by developing software. By using ORiN, development of manufacture-independent and model-independent application becomes easy.

By utilizing ORiN, various application software development and active multi-vender system construction by third-party companies are expected. In addition, on economy side, increase of manufacturing competitiveness, expansion of FA market, advancement of software industry in FA, and creation of FA engineering industry are also expected.

== Features ==
ORiN is independent from hardware, and all ORiN specifications are for software. ORiN (Version 2) is composed of the following three key technology specifications.

1. CAO (Controller Access Object), standard program interface specifications : Specifications to facilitate generalization of application software
2. CRD (Controller Resource Definition), standard data schema specifications : Specifications to facilitate data exchange between application software
3. CAP (Controller Access Protocol), standard communication protocol : Protocol for communication between FA devices and applications Three types of CAP are defined: CAP (SOAP), e-CAP (HTTP), b-CAP (TCP/UDP).

With these three key standard technologies, ORiN provides following features.

- Unified accessing model and data representation
- Variable and file based access to the resources in the device
- Applicable to various devices in the factory
- No device modification is required for ORiN connection
- XML data representation to cooperate with other systems
- Easy device access over Internet with simple parameter setup
- Configurable application interface

== History ==
- ORiN project started as a part of standardization activities in Japan Robot Association (JARA).
- With the support from New Energy and Industrial Technology Development Organization (NEDO), ORiN system was developed from 1999 (3 years activity).
- Member companies of JARA participated field robot connection test at International Robot Exhibition (IREX) in 1999 and 2001. ORiN Version 1.0 was formally created in 2002.
- ORiN Forum was created in 2002 to promote and advance the ORiN standard. (Key members of the Forum: FA device manufacture, software development company, system integrator company, etc.)
- ORiN Forum member companies participated various ORiN field application tests for three years. The test results were reflected to the ORiN Version 2.0 (created in 2005). ORiN2 SDK was released as a supported software product in 2005.
- ORiN application was proposed as an annex of ISO20242-Part4. The DIS of the standard was approved in July 2010.

== ORiN related terms ==
ORiN SDK
ORiN SDK is a software development kit for ORiN Version 1.0, including RAO, standard providers and development tools. The SDK is used to develop original RAO providers and ORiN applications, and the SDK is also used as ORiN execution environment. ORiN Forum distributes the SDK, but the Forum plans to stop the distribution and technical support of the SDK at the end of March 2011.

ORiN2 SDK
ORiN 2 SDK is a software development kit for ORiN Version 2.0. The SDK provides standard interface specifications for applications and devices, standard data schema, and standard communication protocol. Development of provider module (extension module) based on the specifications is also possible with the SDK. DENSO WAVE INCORPORATED, a subsidiary of Denso Corporation, distributes and supports the SDK.

== See also ==
- Application software
- Architecture
- Interface (computing)
- Computer network
- Software framework
- Middleware
- XML
