= British Automation and Robot Association =

UK Trade Association

BARA
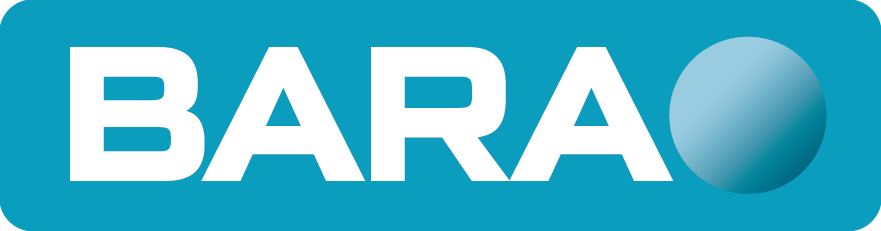
- Industry: Industrial Robots and Automation
- Headquarters: BARA, New Progress House, 34 Stafford Road, Wallington, Surrey, SM6 9AA, UK
- Key people: Oliver Selby (Chairman)
- Website: https://www.automate-uk.com/our-associations/bara/

The British Automation and Robot Association (BARA) is a UK trade membership organisation headquartered in Wallington, Surrey.

== History ==
BARA was founded as the British Robot Association (BRA) in 1977.

As a trade and academic membership association, BRA members principally comprised automation vendors, end users, research and educational establishments; all of which had an interest in the development of the robotics and automation sector in the UK.

In 1981, BRA sponsored Automan, the UK's first automated manufacturing conference and exhibition in Brighton run by Reed Exhibitions. The event moved to the National Exhibition Centre in Birmingham in 1983 and continued as a biennial event until 1991.

BRA was one of the founder members of the International Federation on Robots (IFR), a not-for-profit organisation in Frankfurt, Germany, in 1987.

Following the introduction of automatic equipment within the industrial manufacturing sector, BRA took the decision to change its name to BARA in 1999 to incorporate automation.

In 2009, BARA became part of the PPMA Group of Associations (now Automate UK) trading brand, which represents a range of processing equipment and packaging machinery manufacturers, robotics and automation, and machine vision suppliers in England, Wales, Scotland and Northern Ireland, and across Western Europe and North America.

In June 2022, BARA announced that it would co-host a new Automation UK exhibition in conjunction with UKIVA's Machine Vision Conference and Exhibition at the Coventry Building Society Arena (CBS) Arena in Coventry on 20-21 June 2023.

The Association confirmed it would return to the CBS Arena to hold its second live exhibition and conference event, Automation UK, on 18-19 June 2024 in conjunction with UKIVA's Machine Vision Conference and Exhibition.

== About Automate UK ==
Automate UK (previously named the PPMA Group of Associations until 30 November 2023) is an unincorporated trading brand of PPMA Limited. It comprises the business activities of the BARA, PPMA and UKIVA, headquartered in Wallington, Surrey.
