= Processing and Packaging Machinery Association =

UK Trade Association

PPMA
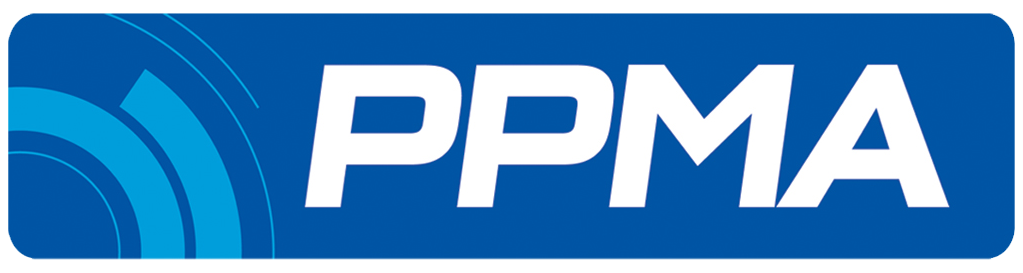
- Company type: Private Limited Company
- Industry: Processing and Packaging
- Headquarters: PPMA Limited, New Progress House, 34 Stafford Road, Wallington, Surrey, SM6 9AA, UK
- Key people: Peter Williamson (Chief Executive Officer)
- Website: automate-uk.com/

The Processing and Packaging Machinery Association (PPMA) is a UK trade membership organisation headquartered in Wallington, Surrey.

The PPMA is part of Automate UK, which represents a range of processing equipment, packaging machinery manufacturers and component suppliers in England, Wales, Scotland and Northern Ireland, and across Western Europe and North America.

== Purpose ==
The PPMA assists member companies with the sales and marketing of industrial processing equipment and packaging machinery through various exhibitions, events, publications, and business and regulatory training.

== History ==
Incorporated on 30 March 1987, the PPMA was born out of a desire to run an exhibition ‘for the industry by the industry’ by eight founder member companies.

The first three-day PPMA Show was launched in 1988 at Telford International Centre. In the proceeding years, the association experienced substantial growth, which included the merger with the Packaging Equipment Manufacturers' Association and the launch of the PPMA's official trade magazine, Machinery Update, in 1989.

As the PPMA Show grew in stature, it moved to the National Exhibition Centre in Birmingham, creating competition with a larger show, Pakex, run by Reed Exhibitions every three years.

In 2002, Reed and the PPMA entered a joint venture to run the PPMA Show two out of every three years and renamed its Pakex Show to Total Show, which replaced the PPMA Show triennially.

In 2009, the PPMA took over the secretariat of the British Automation and Robot Association (BARA) and UK Industrial Vision Association (UKIVA). In January 2010, the Polymer Machinery Manufacturers and Distribution Association (PMMDA) joined forces with the PPMA to bring about four associations operating under the trading brand of the PPMA Group of Associations. Despite the initial optimism, the PPMA and PMMDA parted company in December 2013.

The PPMA ended its 12-year partnership with Reed Exhibitions in 2013 to regain ownership and management of its PPMA Show in 2014. The company also purchased the major exhibition brands of Pakex and Interphex in the UK. Collectively, these shows increased in size and revenue, attracting 400+ exhibitors from manufacturers’ around the world selling into the UK market.

Also, in 2014, the PPMA set up and funded PPMA Business Education Skills and Training (BEST), a registered charity (1156041) in England, Wales and Scotland, to encourage more young people to take up a career in engineering and more PPMA member companies to take on apprentices.

In 2019, the company staged its first PPMA Conference at the National Conference Centre.

On 31 January 2020, the PPMA launched a new training academy, designed to upskill and cross-train company employees through a range of practical engineering and online learning modules.

In a bid to drive strategic events and services, the PPMA announced the part-time appointment of Peter Williamson to the position of CEO on 13 December 2022.

On 1 December 2023, the PPMA announced the group had changed its name from the PPMA Group of Associations to Automate UK to reflect the greater adoption of automation throughout the manufacturing sector.

On 8 March 2024, PPMA BEST changed its name to Automate BEST to align with the branding of the Automate UK (formerly PPMA Group of Associations).

== PPMA Show ==
PPMA Show is the UK’s largest annual event for the processing and packaging industry.

The first exhibition was staged at Telford International Centre in 1988, before the show moved to the National Exhibition Centre. The three-day exhibition, now held twice every three years, showcases the latest innovations in materials, containers and packaging design, which includes technological advancements in robotics and machine vision technology. It principally supports those within the food, beverage, pharmaceutical, household chemicals and toiletries industries.

On 2 July 2020, it was announced that PPMA Show 2020 (29 September - 1 October) had been postponed until September 2021 due to the Coronavirus (COVID-19) pandemic. In a bid to connect a range of industry buyers and suppliers, the PPMA launched a new PPMA Show Meeting Hub on 7 September 2020 to provide users with access to over 1,500 brands from over 300 PPMA Show 2020 exhibitors.

The PPMA Show returned to the NEC on 28–30 September 2021.

The next live Show is scheduled to take place at the NEC in September 2026.

== PPMA Total Show ==
PPMA Total Show is the UK's largest triennial event for the processing and packaging industry, held at the National Exhibition Centre.

The first PPMA Total Show was staged at the NEC on 27–29 September 2016. It incorporates the three major international exhibition brands of PPMA, Pakex and Interphex to showcase the latest in processing and packaging machinery, robotics and industrial vision systems. It also includes the latest innovations in materials, containers and packaging design.

In addition to the food, beverage, pharmaceuticals, household chemicals industries, the PPMA Total Show brand also reaches buyers from building supplies, pet food, micro-breweries and distilleries, FMCG, and contract packagers.

The Association's next triennial PPMA Total Show is scheduled to take place on 23-25 September 2025.

== Machinery Update ==
Launched in 1989, Machinery Update is the official publication of the PPMA, which targets key buyers and industry decision makers.

The bimonthly magazine is devoted to publishing news of technical developments in the design and use of processing equipment and packaging machinery. It also features news and trends on robotics and automation, and industrial vision.

== Affiliations ==
The PPMA is an affiliate member of Make UK, formerly the Engineering Employers' Federation, which represents UK manufacturers. The Association is also a member of Export Partners UK.

== About Automate UK ==
Automate UK (previously named the PPMA Group of Associations until 30 November 2023) is an unincorporated trading brand of PPMA Limited. It comprises the business activities of the PPMA, BARA and UKIVA, headquartered in Wallington, Surrey. The Group's current Chairman is Peter Williamson (CEO), who took over from James Causebrook on 6 December 2024. Mark Stepney was appointed Vice Chairman.
