= UK Industrial Vision Association =

UK Trade Association

- Industry: Industrial vision
- Headquarters: UKIVA, New Progress House, 34 Stafford Road, Wallington, Surrey, SM6 9AA, UK
- Key people: Simon Hickman (chairman)
- Website: www.ppma.co.uk/ukiva

The UK Industrial Vision Association (UKIVA) is a UK trade membership organisation headquartered in Wallington, Surrey.

UKIVA was founded on 18 March 1992 as an independent voice for the industrial vision industry in the UK. In 2009, it also became part of the PPMA Group of Associations (now Automate UK) trading brand, which represents a range of processing equipment and packaging machinery manufacturers, Machine Vision, and Robotic and Automation suppliers in England, Wales, Scotland and Northern Ireland, and across Western Europe and North America.

== Purpose ==
UKIVA promotes the use of image processing technology throughout the UK industry; providing an industry voice and helping its member companies to gain a competitive advantage through seminars, conferences, and technical information.

== Machine Vision Conference & Exhibition ==
Due to the growing demand and interest in machine vision technology, UKIVA staged its first Machine Vision Conference & Exhibition on 27 April 2017 at the Arena MK, Milton Keynes, which has become an annual event for the industrial vision community.

In 2020, UKIVA was forced to postpone its conference and exhibition due to the coronavirus (COVID-19) pandemic, opting instead for a free to access virtual Technology Presentation Hub, which went live on 14 May 2020.

Due to ongoing travel restrictions, the Association ran a virtual event to replace the postponed live conference and exhibition on 15 July 2021.

After a two-year break from live events, UKIVA reinstated its 'in person' conference and exhibition on 28 April 2022 at the newly named Marshall Arena.

In May 2022, UKIVA announced that would co-host its 2023 conference and exhibition in conjunction with BARA's first Automation UK exhibition, comprising a new two-day format at the CBS Arena in Coventry on 20-21 June 2023.

The Association held its sixth live exhibition and conference event on 18-19 June 2024. Its seventh two-day conference followed on 7-8 May 2025.

== Vision in Action ==
In Spring 2012, UKIVA printed its first Vision in Action newsletter, which has since grown in size and readership to become the UK's only trade industrial magazine for the industrial vision community. The publication is free to subscribers and is produced biannually.

== Chairman ==
In December 2024, Simon Hickman was elected chairman of UKIVA. Hickman succeeded Allan Anderson, who completed his two-year cycle in the chair.

== About Automate UK ==
Automate UK (previously named the PPMA Group of Associations until 30 November 2023) is an unincorporated trading brand of PPMA Limited. It comprises the business activities of the UKIVA, PPMA and BARA, headquartered in Wallington, Surrey.
