= KUKA =

German robot manufacturer

Coordinates: 48.37°N 10.93565°E

KUKA SE & Co. KGaA
- Type: Kommanditgesellschaft auf Aktien
- Industry: Automation
- Founded: 1898; 128 years ago
- Headquarters: Augsburg, Bavaria, Germany
- Key people: Christoph Schell (CEO and chairman)
- Revenue: €3.9 billion(2025)
- Number of employees: 14,542 (2025)
- Divisions: KUKA (Robotics and Systems); Swisslog; Swisslog Healthcare; Translogic; Visual Components; Device Insight
- Website: www.kuka.com

KUKA SE & Co. KGaA is a German automation and robotics company headquartered in Augsburg, Bavaria. It develops and manufactures industrial robots and provides automated manufacturing systems, intralogistics and warehouse automation, healthcare automation, software and related services. The KUKA Group reported revenue of €3.9 billion and 14,542 employees in 2025.

The company was founded in Augsburg in 1898 by Johann Josef Keller and Jakob Knappich. In 1973, KUKA developed the FAMULUS, the first industrial robot with six electromechanically driven axes.

KUKA expanded into logistics automation through its acquisition of Swisslog in 2014. In 2016, Chinese appliance manufacturer Midea Group launched a takeover offer for KUKA, and completed the acquisition of a 94.55% stake in January 2017. Midea acquired the remaining minority shares in 2022.

== History ==
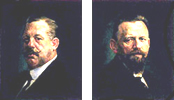
The company was founded in 1898 by Johann Josef Keller and Jacob Knappich

The acetylene factory in Augsburg was founded in 1898 in Augsburg, Germany, by Johann Josef Keller and Jakob Knappich for the production of low-cost domestic and municipal lighting, household appliances, and automobile headlights. Their production extended into autonomous welding equipment in 1905.

After the First World War, Keller and Knappich resumed production of safety winches, manual winches, and power winches and began manufacturing large containers. As a result, Bayerische Kesselwagen GmbH was formed in 1922. The new company developed and produced superstructures for municipal vehicles. In 1927, this business division presented the first large garbage truck. The name KUKA came into being in the same year through the company's name at that time, "Keller und Knappich Augsburg". In Hungary, the name—being prominently displayed on the first closed container garbage trucks—eventually became a generic trademark and ultimately a synonym for trash cans.

Keller & Knappich GmbH merged with part of Industrie-Werke Karlsruhe AG to become Industrie-Werke Karlsruhe Augsburg Aktiengesellschaft, eventually shortened to KUKA (Keller und Knappich Augsburg).

The development and manufacture of spot welding equipment began in 1936. By 1939, KUKA had more than 1,000 employees.

Starting in 1934, KUKA expanded to become a major company. Its owners joined the NSDAP early on and benefited from the contacts this provided. The production of machine tools and machine components for the increasing demands of the arms industry, such as being an important supplier for Messerschmitt AG, and of anti-aircraft guns, led to significant workforce expansion. The company had 1,000 employees in 1939, and this number steadily increased with the use of prisoners of war, “civilian workers,” and concentration camp prisoners. In 1944, 1,400 people working for “KUKA” were housed in Collective Camp II alone.

After the major destruction of the company during the Second World War in 1945, KUKA resumed manufacturing welding machines and other small appliances. With new products such as the double-cylinder circular knitting machine and the portable typewriter "Princess," KUKA introduced new industrial fields and gained independence from the supply sector.

In 1956, KUKA manufactured the first automatic welding system for refrigerators and washing machines and supplied the first multi-spot welding line to Volkswagen AG. Ten years later, the first friction welding machine went into production.

In 1971, the delivery of the first robotic welding system for the S-Class took place. A year later, the magnetic arc-welding machine came to market.

In 1973, KUKA created its own industrial robot, FAMULUS. At that time, the company belonged to the Quandt group.

In 1980, the Quandt family withdrew, and a publicly owned firm was established. In 1981, KUKA's main activities were grouped into three independent companies: KUKA Schweissanlagen und Roboter GmbH, KUKA Umwelttechnik GmbH and KUKA Wehrtechnik GmbH, which was re-sold to Rheinmetall in 1999. Towards the end of 1982, LSW Maschinenfabrik GmbH, Bremen became a subsidiary of KUKA.

In 1993, the first laser-roof-seam welding systems were manufactured. These welding systems were then further expanded to adhesive bonding and sealing technologies in the following year. Around the same time, KUKA took over the tools and equipment manufacturer Schwarzenberg GmbH and expanded its business to China and the USA in the following years.

In 1995, the company was split into KUKA Robotics Corporation and KUKA Schweißanlagen (now KUKA Systems), both subsidiaries of KUKA AG. The company is a member of the Robotics Industries Association (RIA), the International Federation of Robotics (IFR), and the German engineering association VDMA.

In 1996, KUKA Schweissanlagen GmbH became an independent company and, two years later, became the leader among European welding equipment manufacturers. The supply of the first pressing tools for automobile side-walls made of high-strength steel began in 2002. The company launched the KUKA RoboScan with a remote laser welding head in 2003. Since 2006, KUKA Systems has operated its own body shell factory in Toledo, Ohio, producing the bodywork for the Jeep Wrangler by Chrysler.

In the course of internationalisation and expansion of business units and technologies such as reshaping, tooling, bonding, sealing, etc., KUKA Schweissanlagen GmbH became KUKA Systems GmbH in 2007. In 2010, KUKA presented a newly developed standardized cell concept for welding machines, KUKA flexibleCUBE.

In the automation sector, KUKA Systems offers standard and customized products for industrial production automation; joining technologies and component handling are among their activities. The technologies are tested, and the production processes are fully optimized before development. The company also provides engineering and individual counseling.

In June 2016, Midea Group offered to buy Kuka for about €4.5 billion ($5 billion). Midea completed the takeover bid in January 2017 by purchasing the 94.55% voting stake in the company.

In late 2017, Kuka announced that 250 employees of KUKA Systems were terminated. The management cited project troubles as the reason.

In November 2022, Midea Group acquired the remaining 4.69% stake in Kuka.

Most robots are finished in "KUKA Orange" (the official corporate color) or black.

== Notable milestones ==
- 1971: Europe's first welding transfer line built for Daimler-Benz.
- 1973: The world's first industrial robot with six electromechanically driven axes, known as FAMULUS.
- 1976: IR 6/60 – A new robot type with six electromechanically driven axes and an offset wrist.
- 1989: A new generation of industrial robots is developed – brushless drive motors for low maintenance and higher technical availability.
- 2004: The first Cobot KUKA LBR 3 is released. This computer-controlled lightweight robot can interact directly with humans without safety fences, resulting from a collaboration with the German Aerospace Center institute since 1995.
- 2007: KUKA Titan – at the time, the biggest and strongest industrial robot with six axes, entered the Guinness Book of World Records.
- 2010: The robot series KR QUANTEC completely covers the load range of 90 to 300 kg with a reach of up to 3100 mm.
- 2012: The new small robot series KR AGILUS is launched.
- 2014: The company gained recognition with a video supposedly teasing their new robot, specialized in Table Tennis, showing a match against Timo Boll, a German professional. The video, a commercial with heavy CGI, received criticism from the table tennis community but has been viewed over 10 million times on YouTube and has won numerous awards.
- 2016: KUKA was acquired by the Chinese company Midea Group.
- 2018: KUKA presents first consumer robot prototype (KUKA i-do, a modular service robot) at Hannover Messe 2018; the robot takes a selfie of German chancellor Angela Merkel.

== System information and application areas ==
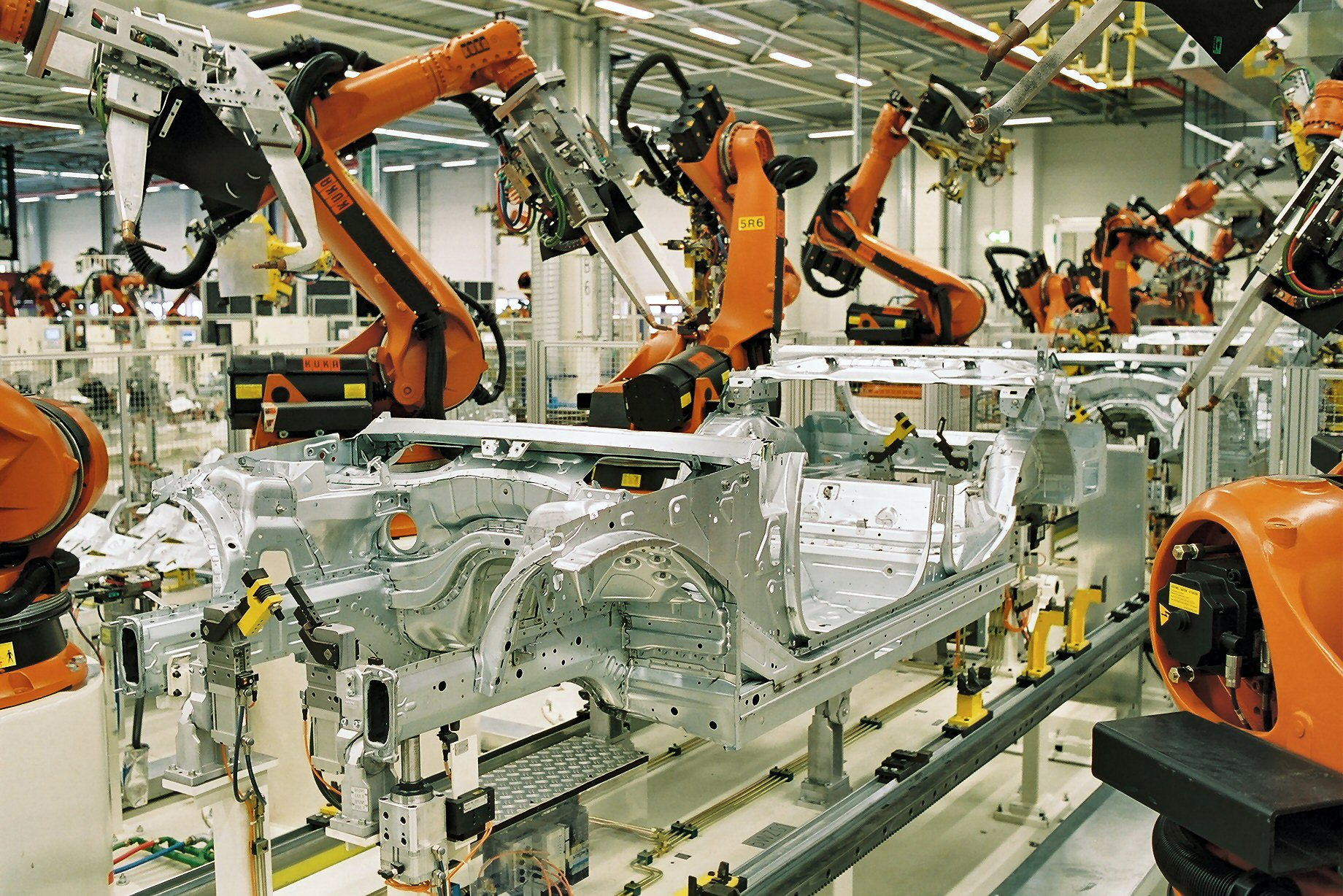
Spot welding in the automotive industry

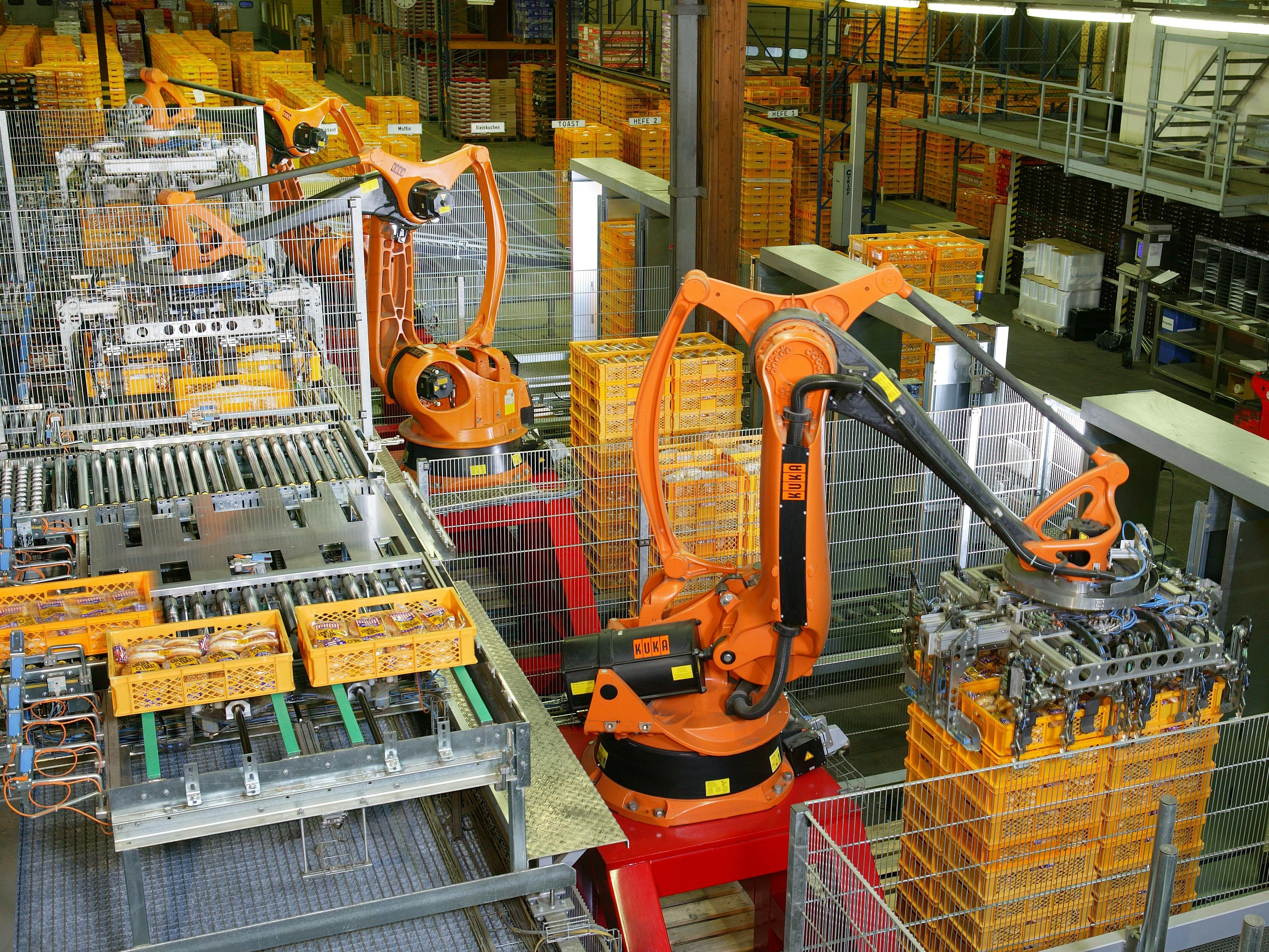
Palletising food in a bakery

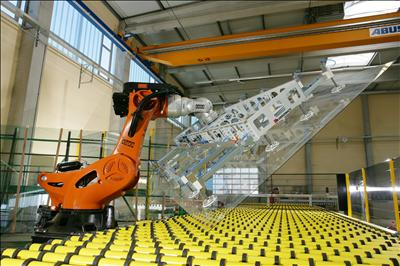
Flat-glass handling, heavy duty robot with 1,000 kg payload

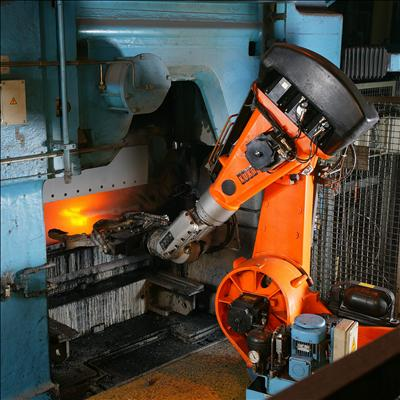
Foundry automation with a heat-resistant robot

=== System information ===
The KUKA system software is the operating software and the core of the entire control system. It contains all the basic functions needed for the deployment of the robot system.

Robots come with a control panel (the KCP, or KUKA Control Panel), also known as a teach pendant, which features a display and axis control buttons for A1-A6, as well as an integrated 6D mouse that allows the robot to be moved in manual (teaching) mode. The pendant also enables users to view and modify existing programs, as well as create new ones. To manually control the axes, an enabling switch (also called a dead man's switch) on the back of the pendant must be pressed halfway for motion to be possible. The connection to the controller is a proprietary video interface and CAN bus for the safety interlock system and button operation.

A rugged computer located in the control cabinet communicates with the robot system via the Multi Function Card (MFC), which controls the real-time servo drive electronics. The Digital Servo Electronics (DSE) board is in the control cabinet, usually located on or integrated into the MFC. While the Resolver Digital Converter (RDW/RDC) board is located in the base of the robot. Servo position feedback is transmitted to the controller through the DSE-RDW/RDC connector.

== Fields of application ==
=== Aerospace ===
KUKA Systems supplied the TIG welding cell for the upper stage of the Ariane 5 launcher-rocket. TIG welding stands for tungsten inert gas welding and is a special form of arc welding, which is one of the core activities of KUKA Systems. The company also provides apparatuses and appliances for the construction of aircraft structural elements. Aerospace customers include Boeing, SpaceX, Bell and Airbus.

=== Automotive ===
The KUKA Systems portfolio includes a wide range of production automation solutions for joining and assembling vehicle body structures, from low-scale automated production facilities to highly flexible manufacturing systems. This includes the production of individual equipment or subassemblies to the assembly of complete body structures and mechanical parts. Equipment for assembling discs, mounting systems for vehicle bodies and chassis (so-called “marriage”), and component installation are also available.

BMW, GM, Chrysler, Ford, Volvo, Hyundai, Volkswagen, and Daimler AG are among the customers in this business sector.

In September 2026, Colorado-based car wash chain Autowash debuted a new in-house touchless car wash system utilizing KUKA arms.

=== Production of rail vehicles ===
Manufacturers of rail vehicles are also customers of KUKA Systems for the construction of locomotives, subway wagons, or in setting up innovative and highly automated production lines for freight wagons.

=== Production of photovoltaic modules ===
KUKA Systems offers solutions for every step of photovoltaic module production, from brick-sawing to cell handling and cross-tie soldering to framing and packaging of modules.

=== Welding technology – General ===
KUKA Systems is active in various other industrial sectors as well. Examples include the production of baby strollers and the production of white goods for BSH (Bosch und Siemens Hausgeräte GmbH).

== KUKA Entertainment ==
In 2001, KUKA partnered with RoboCoaster Ltd to develop the world's first passenger-carrying industrial robot. This robotic ride features roller coaster-style seats attached to robotic arms, offering programmable manoeuvres. Riders themselves can also program the motions of their ride. A second-generation system, the RoboCoaster G2, launched in 2010 at Universal's Islands of Adventure theme park in Orlando, Florida, enhances the experience with synchronized movements through attractions like Harry Potter and the Forbidden Journey's. The seats are mounted on robotic arms, which are then affixed to a track, enabling the arms to navigate through the attraction while synchronizing their movements with the show elements of the ride (including animated props, projection surfaces, etc.). In 2025, Universal opened Monsters Unchained: The Frankenstein Experiment at Universal's Epic Universe featuring an upgraded version of the KUKA arm technology. The seats are also mounted on top of the KUKA arm, allowing for the top of the ride vehicle to be removed to make it less of a closed-off experience.

KUKA's collaboration with RoboCoaster extends to Hollywood, with appearances in films such as Die Another Day, where KUKA robots depicted laser-wielding threats in an Iceland ice palace scene, and The Da Vinci Code, where a KUKA robot handed Robert Langdon a cryptex.

In 2007, KUKA introduced a simulator based on the Robocoaster, featured in attractions like The Sum Of All Thrills ride at EPCOT in Lake Buena Vista, Florida. The ride closed on September 14, 2016.

Recently, KUKA robotic arms have been integrated into Royal Caribbean cruise liners' bionic bars. Users select drinks via tablet interface, with robotic arms mixing an array of spirits, mixers, and liqueurs to craft custom cocktails.

== Gallery ==
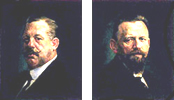
1898 Company founded by Johann Josef Keller and Jacob Knappich

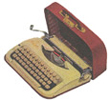
1949 an Augsburg Princess

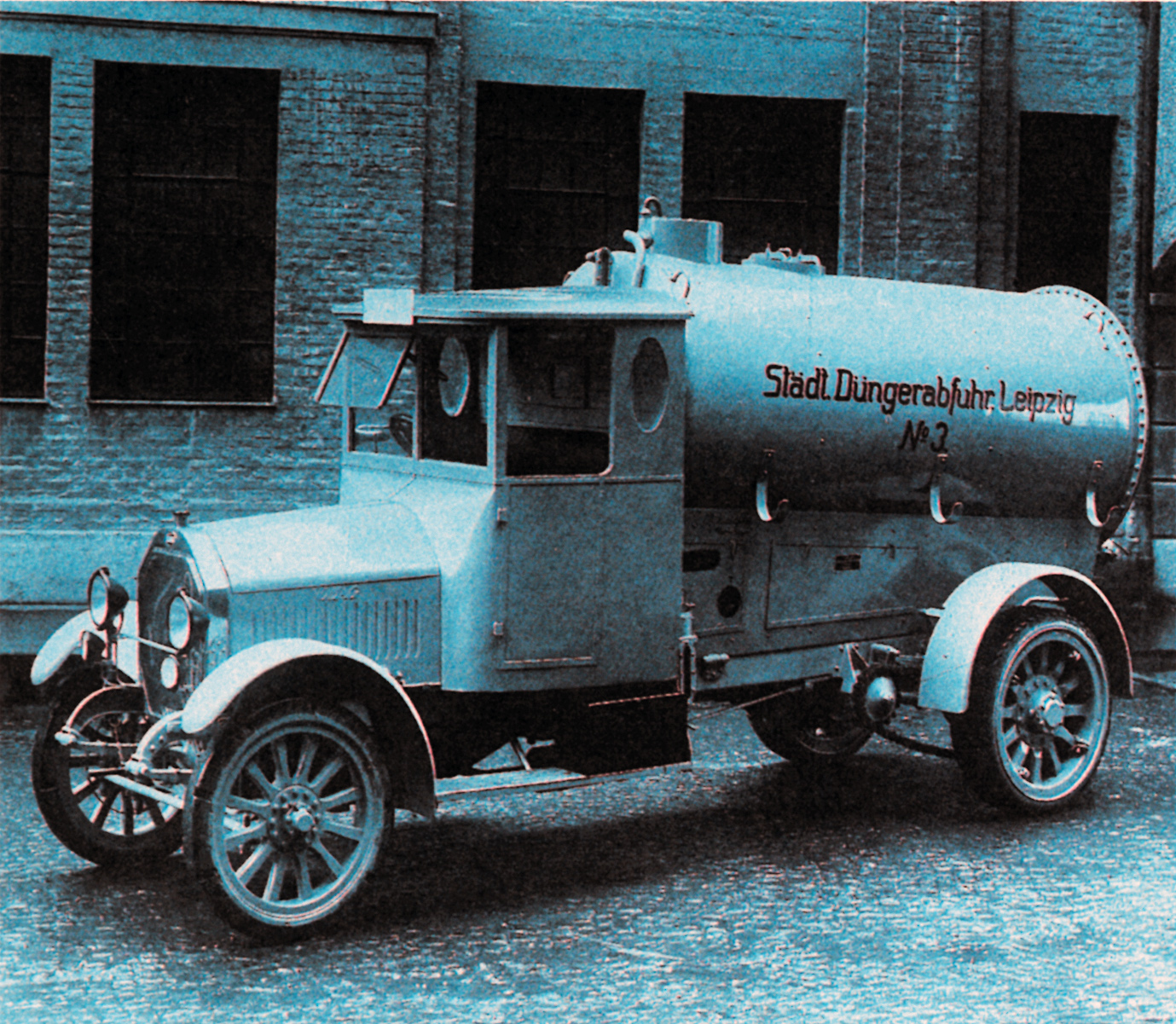
1920 Success in large container construction

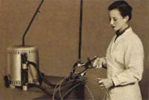
1931 Resistance Welding

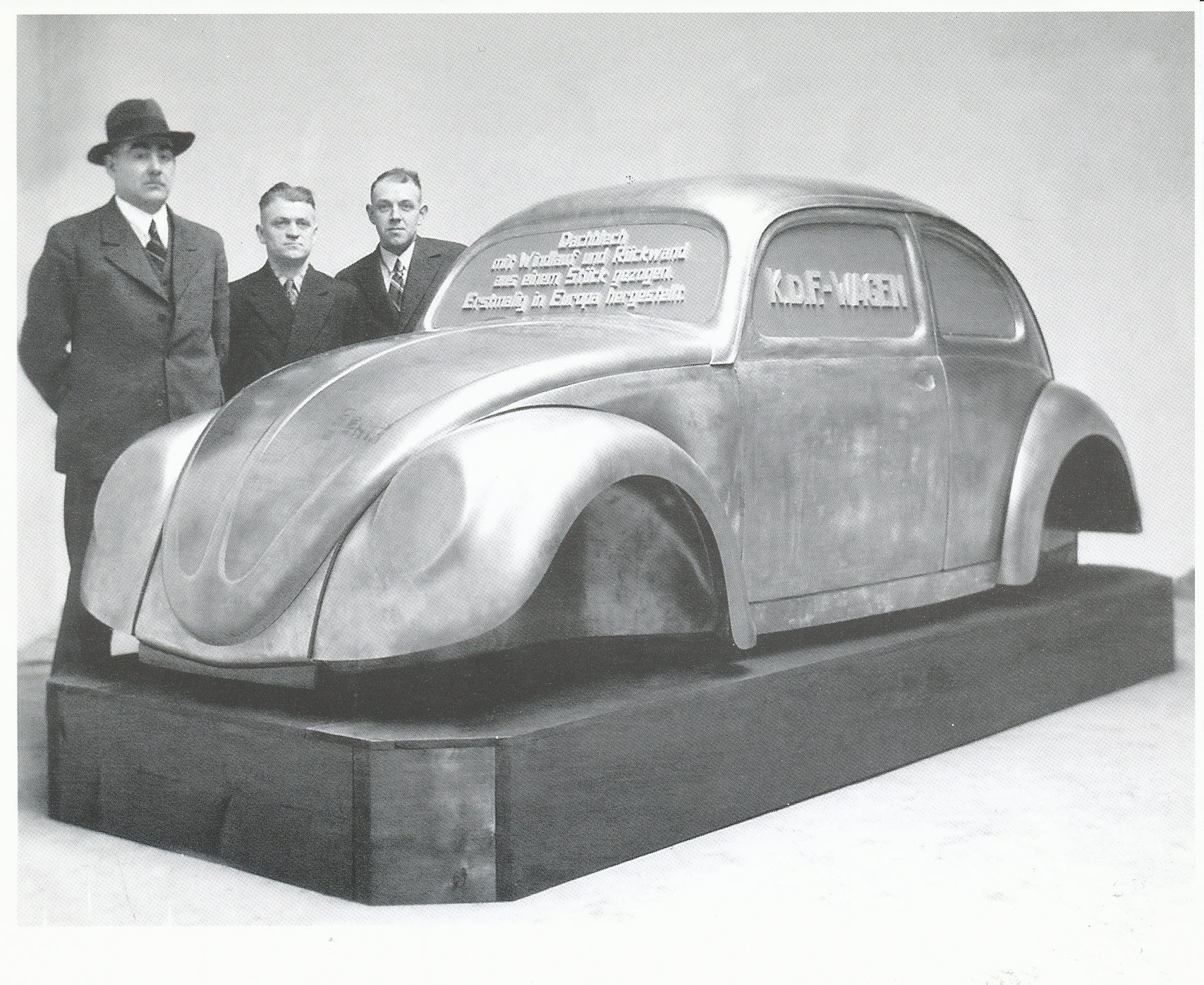
1934 KdF Wagen

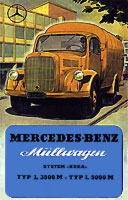
1955 Large container manufacture

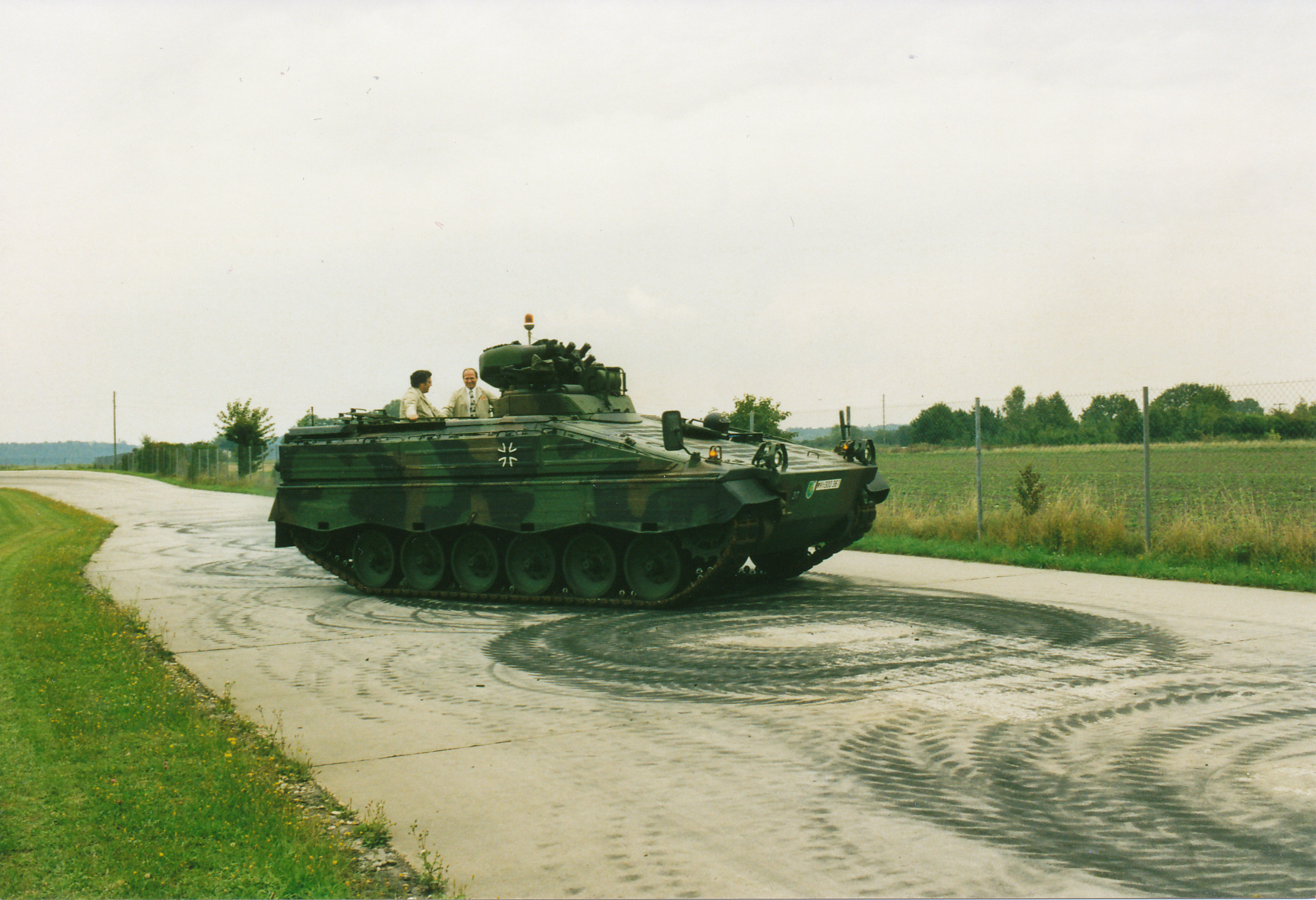
1965 German-American tank program at KUKA

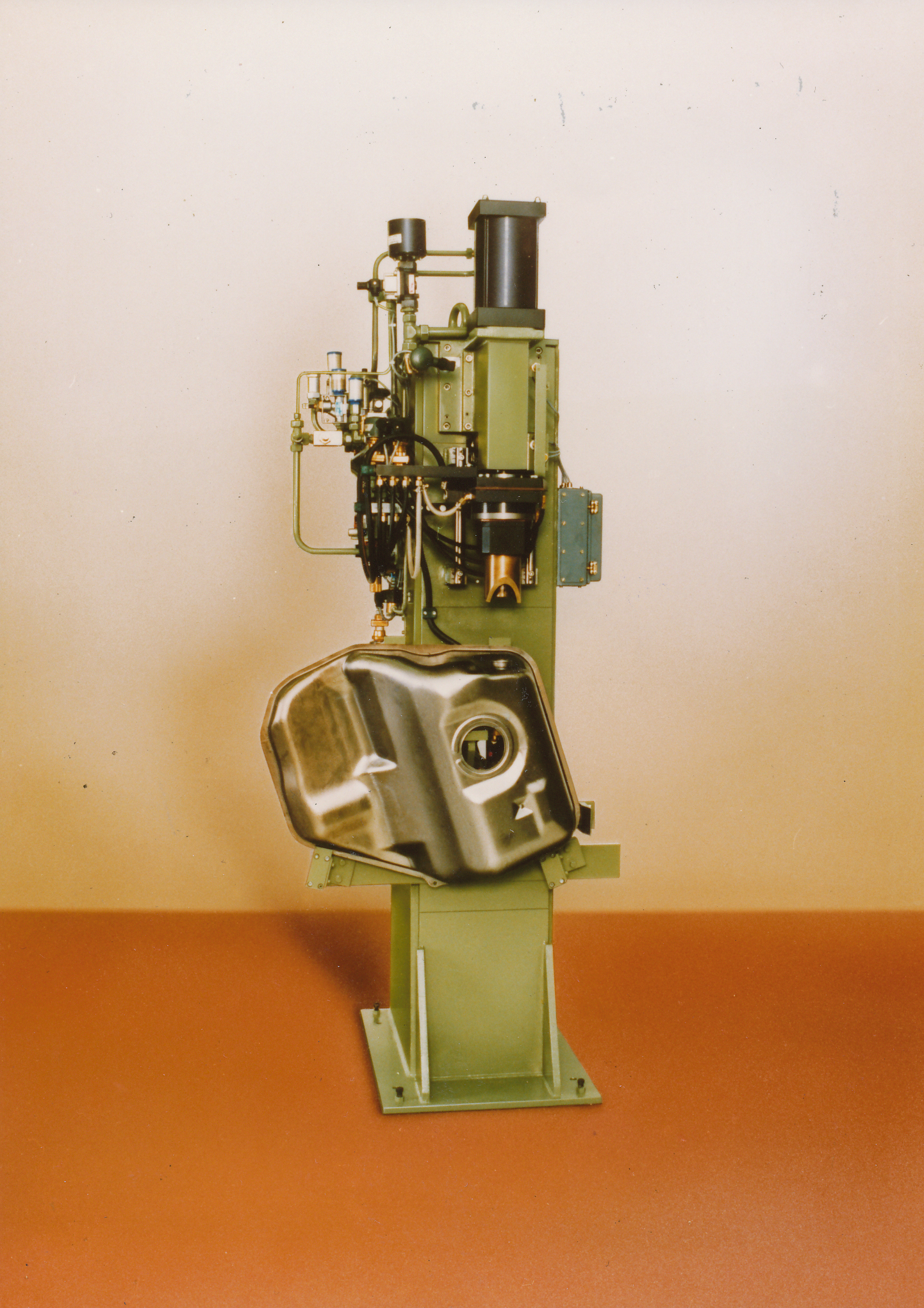
1972 Construction of the first Magnet-arc welding machine

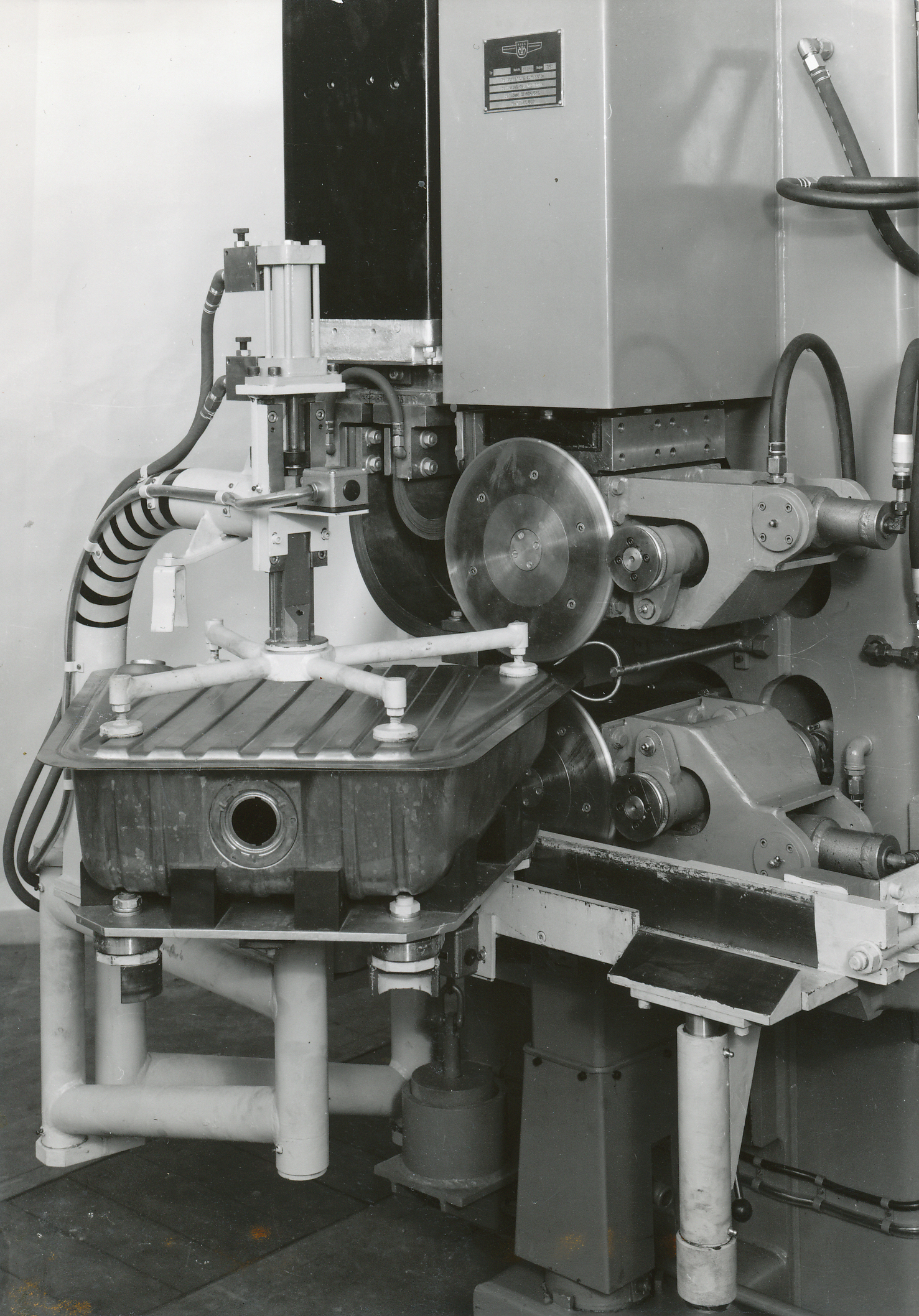
1974 Seam welding

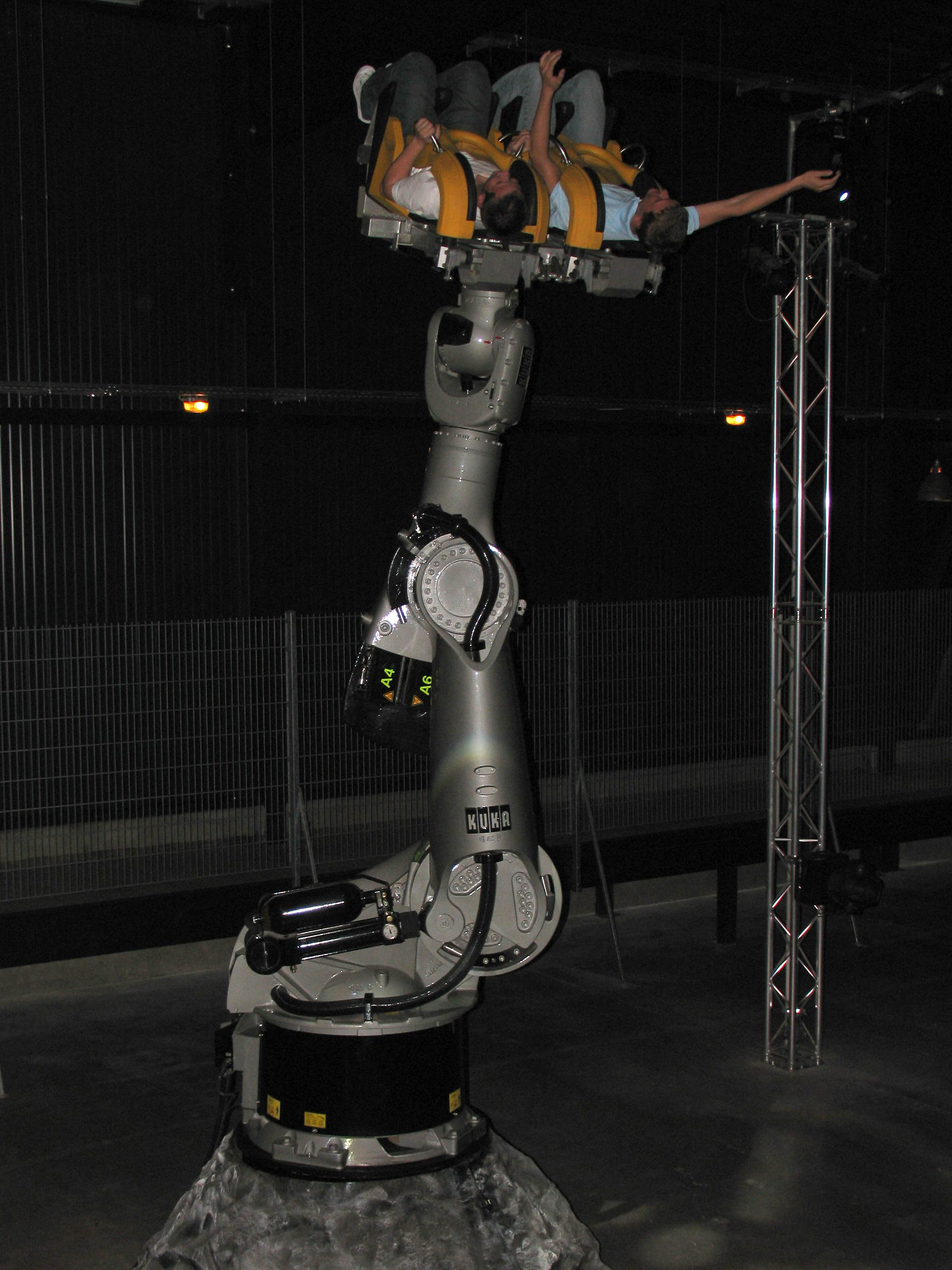
KUKA robotic arms as used on RoboCoasters
