= Association for Advancing Automation =

North American industrial automation trade organization

Association for Advancing Automation (A3)
- Formation: 1974
- Headquarters: Ann Arbor, Michigan
- Fields: Robotics; Automation; Machine vision/imaging; Motors; Motion control; Industrial AI industries
- President: Jeff Burnstein
- Website: www.automate.org

The Association for Advancing Automation (A3) is a North American trade organization focused on advancing automation technologies, including robotics, machine vision, motion control, artificial intelligence, and related workforce development initiatives. A3 serves manufacturers, system integrators, end users, academic institutions, and government organizations involved in industrial automation.

== History ==
A3 traces its origins to organizations formed to support the emerging industrial robotics industry in North America. Over time, its scope expanded to include machine vision, motion control, artificial intelligence, and broader automation technologies. The organization adopted the name Association for Advancing Automation to reflect this broader mission and industry reach.

== Programs and initiatives ==
=== AUTOMATE ===
AUTOMATE is an annual automation trade show and conference produced by A3. The event focuses on industrial automation technologies, including robotics, machine vision, motion control, artificial intelligence, and workforce development.

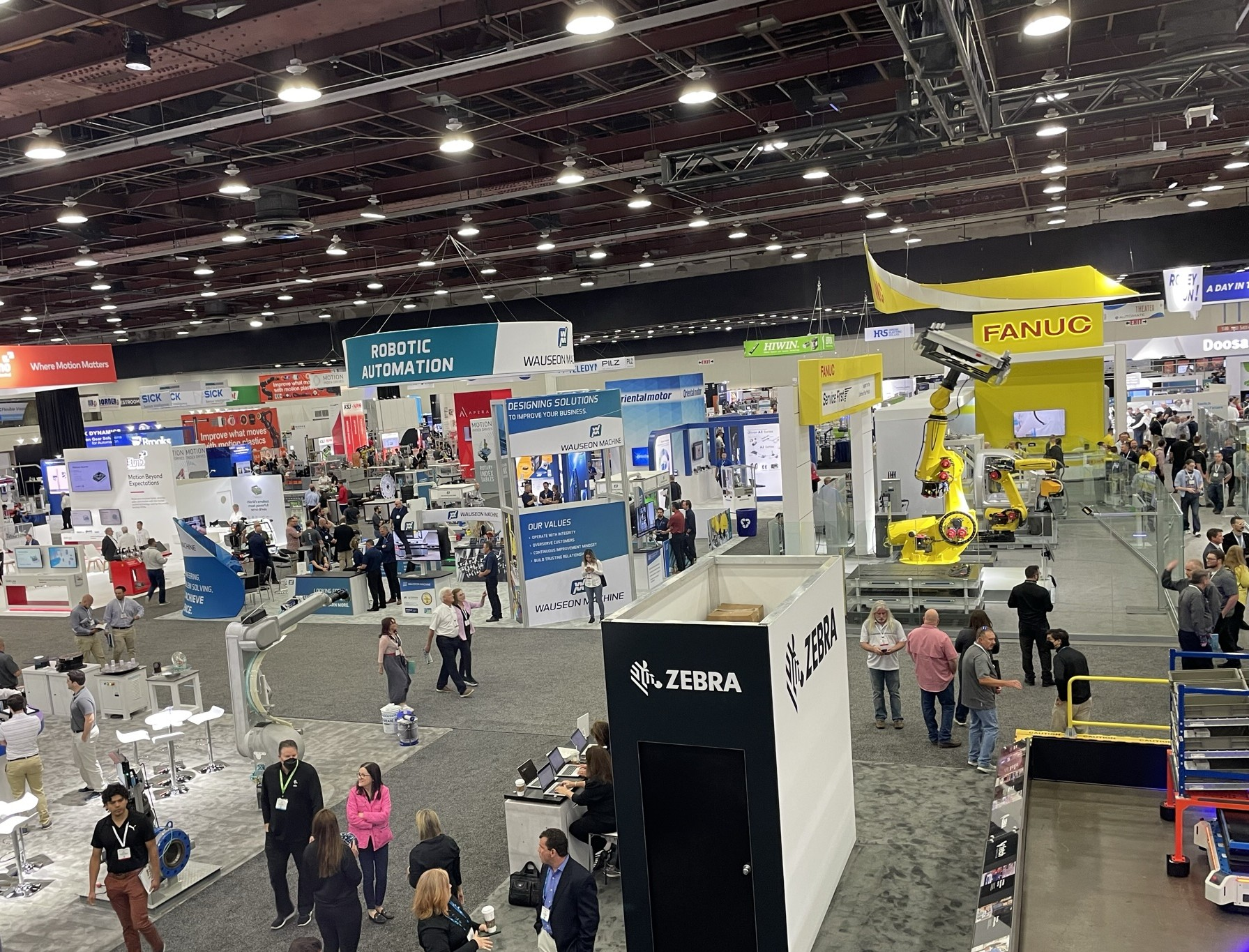
AUTOMATE IMAGE

AUTOMATE features exhibitors from automation manufacturers, system integrators, and end users, along with conference programming addressing technical innovation, business strategy, and workforce challenges. The location of AUTOMATE rotates among major U.S. cities and has included recurring winter conferences held in Florida in recent years.

=== Robotics and machine vision industry ===
A3 represents a broad cross-section of the global robotics and machine vision ecosystem. Member companies include major industrial robot manufacturers, component suppliers, and vision system providers. Companies associated with A3 activities and events have included:

- FANUC
- KUKA
- ABB
- Yaskawa Electric
- Universal Robots
- Kawasaki Robotics
- Omron
- Rockwell Automation
- Cognex
- Schunk (SCHUNK)

These companies support applications across manufacturing, logistics, healthcare, automotive, aerospace, and electronics industries.

=== Robotic Integrator Certification Program ===
A3 administers the Robotic Integrator Certification Program (RICP), an industry certification program designed to evaluate and recognize system integrators that meet defined criteria related to engineering capability, project management, safety practices, and customer support.

The program is intended to provide end users with an objective method for identifying qualified robotic system integrators and to promote best practices within the automation industry.

Certified system integrators recognized through the program have included companies such as:

- JR Automation
- Midwest Engineered Systems
- Acieta

=== Joseph F. Engelberger Robotics Awards ===
The Joseph F. Engelberger Robotics Awards are presented annually by A3 to recognize significant contributions to the advancement of robotics technology, application, leadership, and education. The awards are named after Joseph F. Engelberger, a pioneer of the industrial robotics industry.

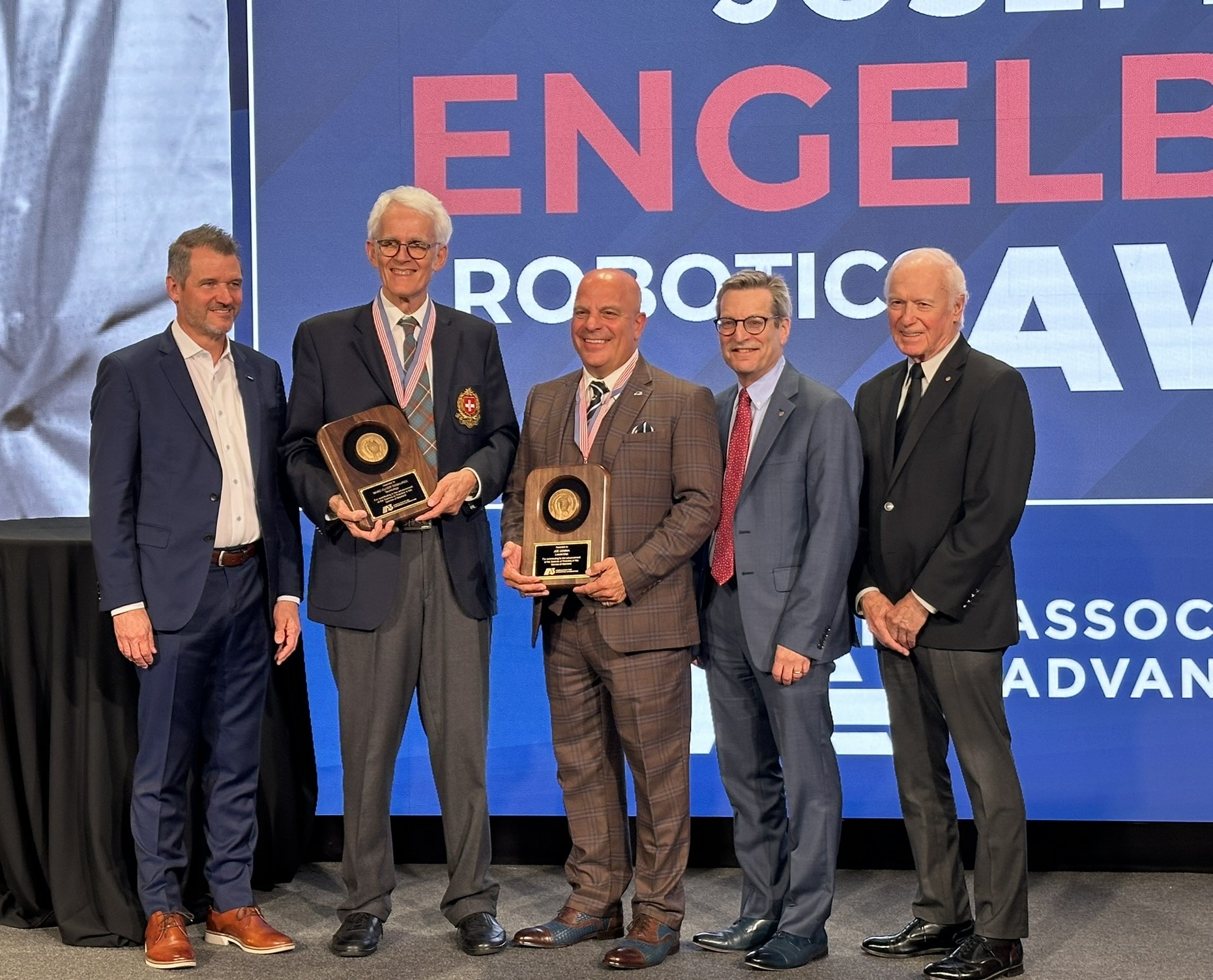
Engelberger Robotics Award

==== Notable recipients ====
Recipients of the Joseph F. Engelberger Robotics Awards have included leaders from industry, academia, and research institutions who have made lasting contributions to robotics and automation. These recipients of the Joseph F. Engelberger Robotics Awards have included:

- Reymond Clavel – recognized for his work on the Delta robot technology
- Oussama Khatib – robotics researcher and professor at Stanford University
- Raffaello D’Andrea – co-founder of Kiva Systems and robotics innovator
- Marc Raibert – robotics entrepreneur and leader of Boston Dynamics
- Melonee Wise – robotics technologist
- Joe Gemma – industry leader and 2024 Engelberger Award recipient
- Jeff Burnstein – 2023 Engelberger Award recipient and robotics industry executive
- Peter Corke – educator and robotics software pioneer
- Bruno Siciliano – robotics academic and educator
- Joseph Engelberger – founder of the Engelberger Awards and pioneer of industrial robotics

=== Committees and industry groups ===
A3 operates a range of committees and industry groups that support collaboration across automation sectors. These committees address topics such as robotics, machine vision, motion control, artificial intelligence, standards development, and workforce training.

Committee participation includes representatives from manufacturers, system integrators, end users, academic institutions, and government organizations, with the goal of advancing automation adoption and best practices across industries.

== Annual conferences ==
In addition to AUTOMATE, A3 supports conferences, workshops, and industry events throughout the year focused on automation technology, standards, and workforce development. These events are hosted in locations across the United States, including recurring winter conferences held in Florida.

== See also ==
- Robotics
- Industrial automation
- Machine vision
- System integrator
