= 2021 in science =

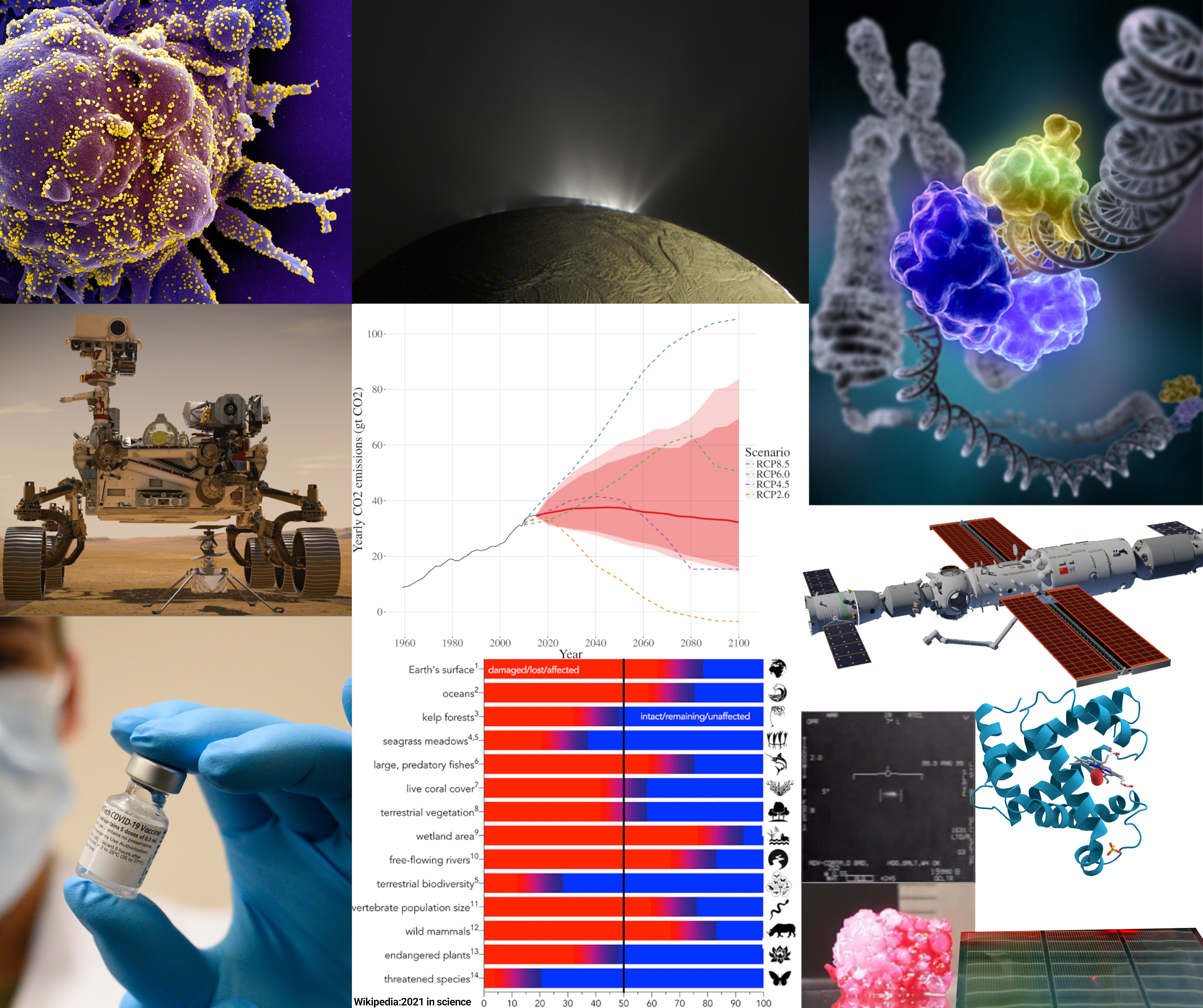

This is a list of several significant scientific events that occurred or were scheduled to occur in 2021.

== Events ==
=== January ===
January 2021 in science

Science Summary for this section (January)

- 1 January – Beginning of the implementation of Plan S, an initiative for open-access science publishing launched in 2018 that requires papers from 2021 onwards from over 10 European countries that resulted from research funded by public grants to be published under an open licence in compliant journals or platforms, available to all.
- 4 January
  - Media reports that engineers worldwide discuss a negative leap second and other possible measures as Earth spun faster in 2020.
  - Researchers describe how the damage to nerve cells caused by motor neurone disease could be repaired by improving the energy levels in mitochondria.
  - Scientists describe a CRISPR-Cas9 genome editing approach which could be used to treat wet age-related macular degeneration caused by VEGFA and Herpes simplex type 1: injection of engineered lentiviruses into the affected anatomical regions for transient editing without inducing off-target edits.
- 5 January – Using theoretical calculations, researchers suggest that humans would be unable to control a superintelligent AI.

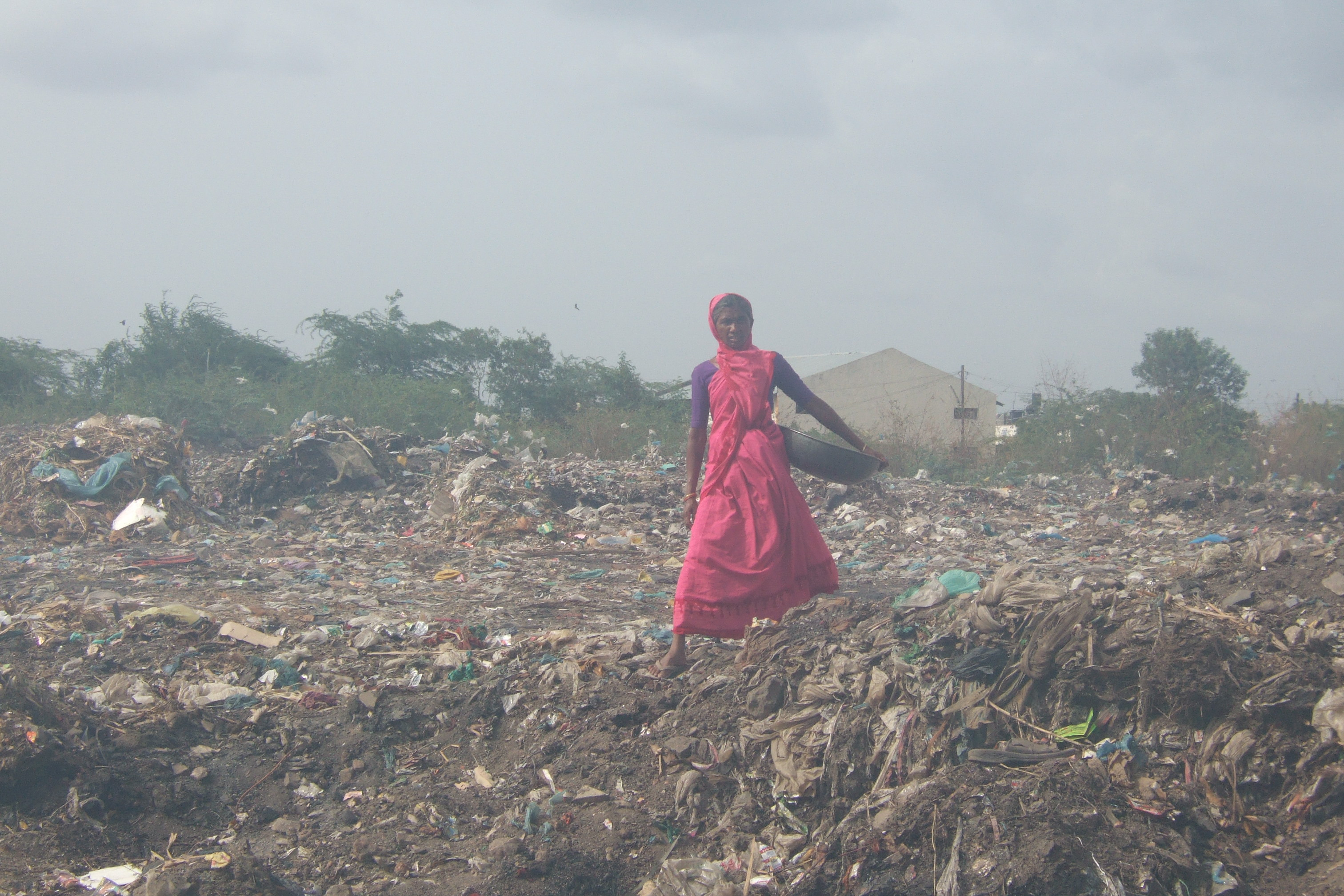
6 January: The first systematic review of the scientific evidence around global waste, its management and its impact on human health and life is published.

- 6 January
  - Scientists report the successful use of gene editing in mice with progeria, a premature aging disease.
  - Chinese researchers report that they have built the world's largest integrated quantum communication network, combining over 700 optical fibers with two QKD-ground-to-satellite links for a total distance between nodes of the network of networks of up to ~4,600 km.
  - The first systematic review of the scientific evidence around global waste, its management and its impact on human health and life is published, providing assessments, suggestions for corrective action, engineering solutions and requests for further research. It finds that about half of all the municipal solid terrestrial waste – or close to one billion tons per year – is either not collected or mismanaged after collection, often being burned in open and uncontrolled fires. Authors conclude that "massive risk mitigation can be delivered" while noting that broad priority areas each lack a "high-quality research base", partly due to the absence of "substantial research funding", which scientists often require.
- 7 January
  - A potential mRNA vaccine for multiple sclerosis is presented by a collaboration including BioNTech, with a study in mice showing great promise for improving symptoms and stopping disease progression.
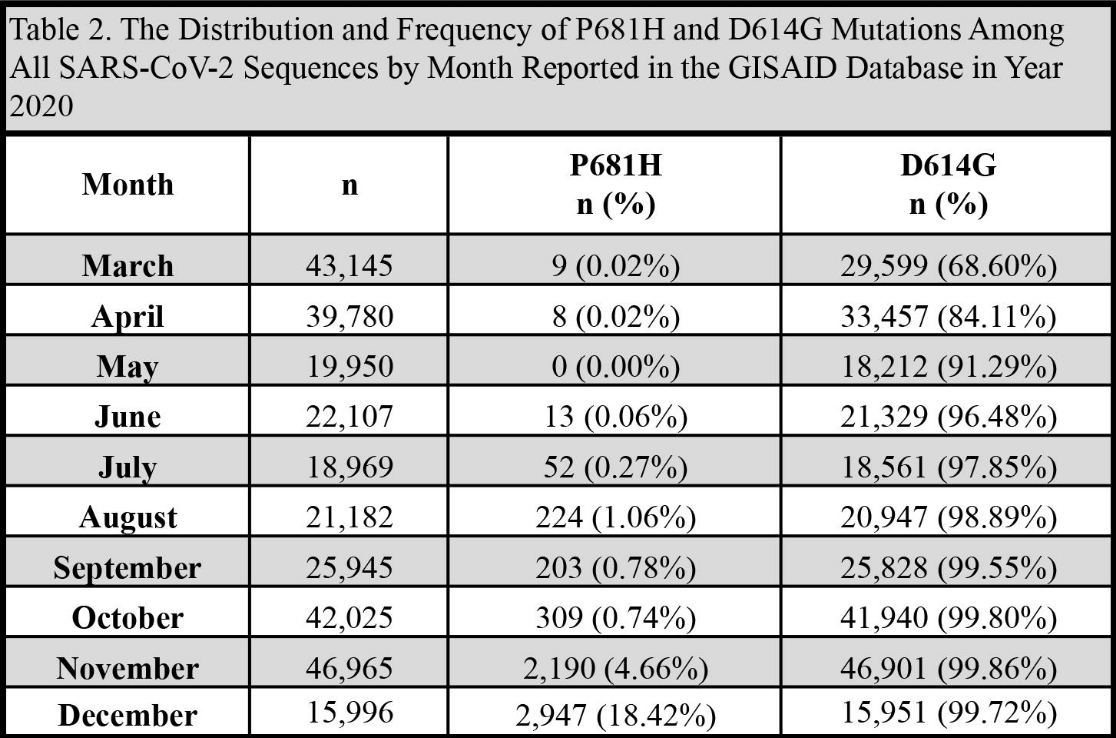
  - The Distribution and Frequency of P681H and D614G Mutations Among All SARS-CoV-2 Sequences by Month Reported in the GISAID Database in Year 2020
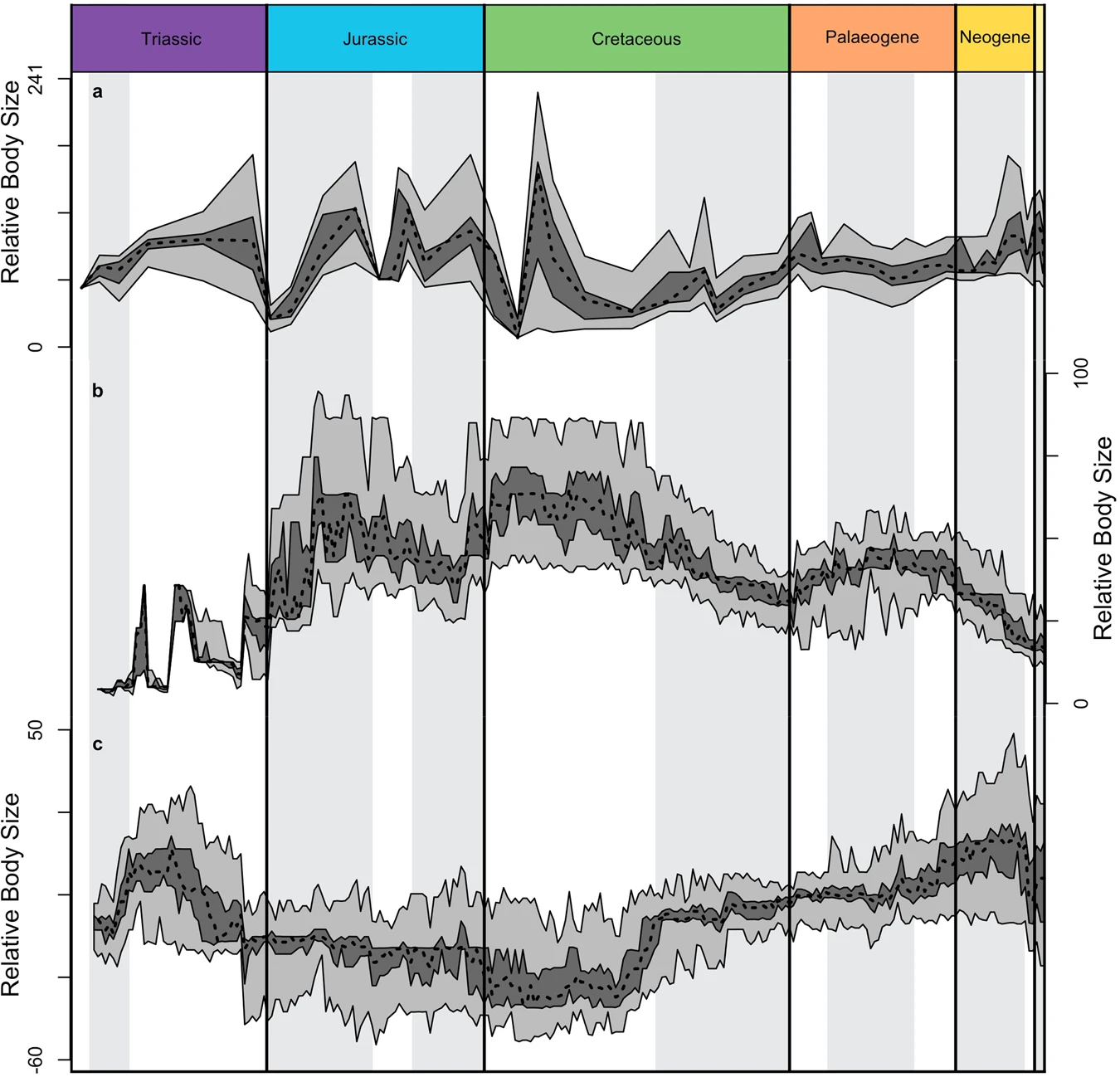
  - Time-series representations of mean relative body size
    Scientists conclude that environmental factors played a major role in the evolution of the slowly-evolving, currently low-diverse Crocodilia (and their ancestor-relatives), with warmer climate being associated with high evolutionary rates and large body sizes.
- 8 January
  - News outlets report that scientists, with the Juno spacecraft orbiting Jupiter, detected an FM radio signal from the moon Ganymede which is reportedly caused by cyclotron maser instability and similar to both WiFi-signals and Jupiter's radio emissions. A study about the radio emissions was published in September 2020 but did not describe them to be of FM nature or similar to WiFi signals.
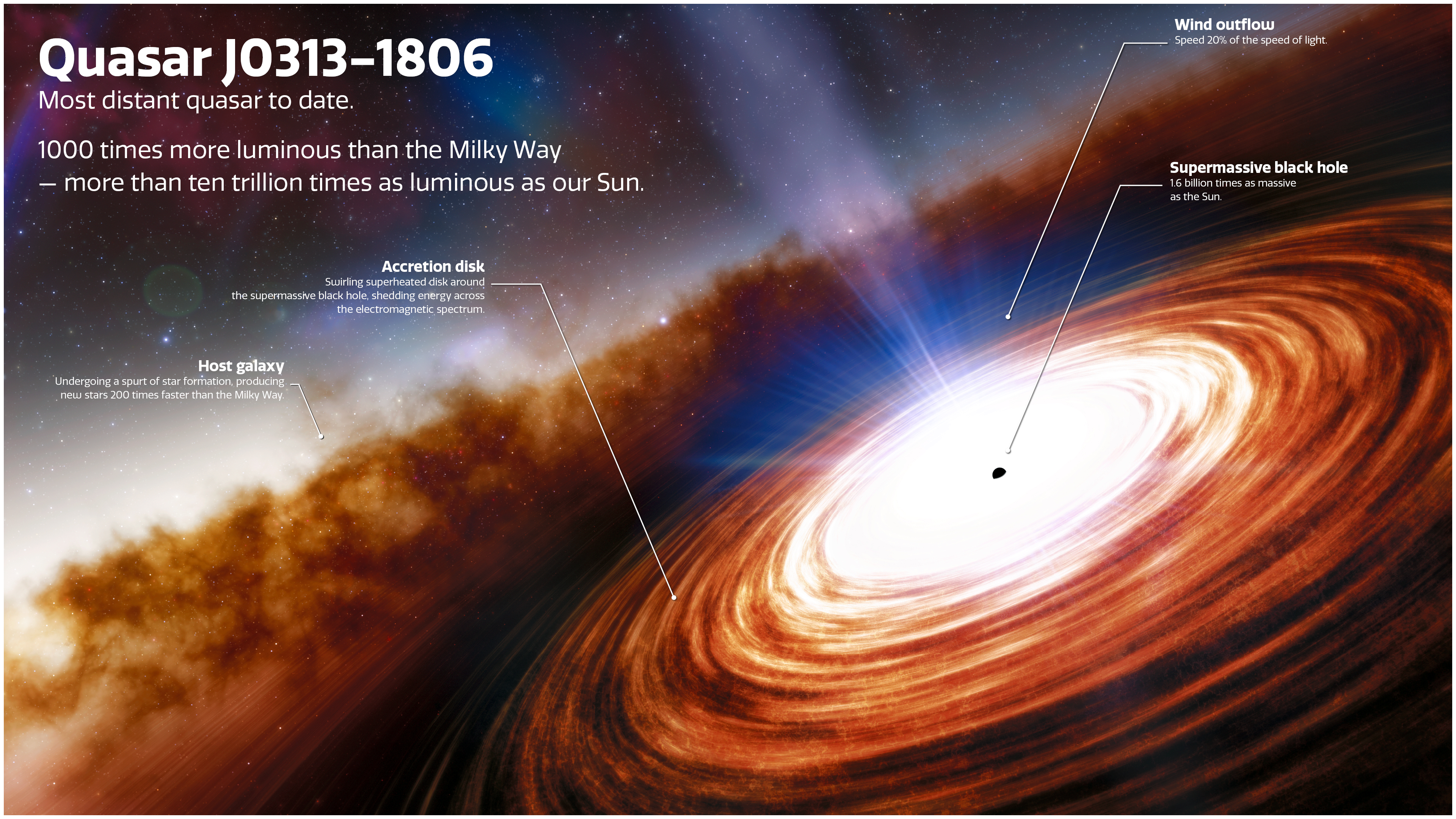
  - Artist's conception of the quasar J0313–1806, seen as it was only 670 million years after the Big Bang
    Scientists report the discovery of the most distant, and therefore oldest, quasar, J0313–1806. It is located 13 bn light-years away, does not yet have an accepted non-identifier name and significantly challenges theoretical models of early SMBH growth, apparently existing just ~670 million years after the Big Bang despite its large size.
  - Archaeologists report that the African cultural phase, called Middle Stone Age, thought to have lasted from ~300–30 ka, lasted to ~11 ka in some places, highlighting significant spatial and temporal cultural variability.
  - WASP-62b is confirmed to be the first hot Jupiter exoplanet without clouds or haze in its observable atmosphere.
- 12 January
  - Scientists report the use of CRISPR/Cas9 genome editing to produce a tenfold increase in super-bug targeting formicamycin antibiotics.
  - COVID-19 pandemic: The National Institute of Infectious Diseases of Japan reports the detection of significant variant of SARS-CoV-2 Lineage P.1 via testing of travelers from Brazil, which was later reported to originate from widespread circulation in Brazil.
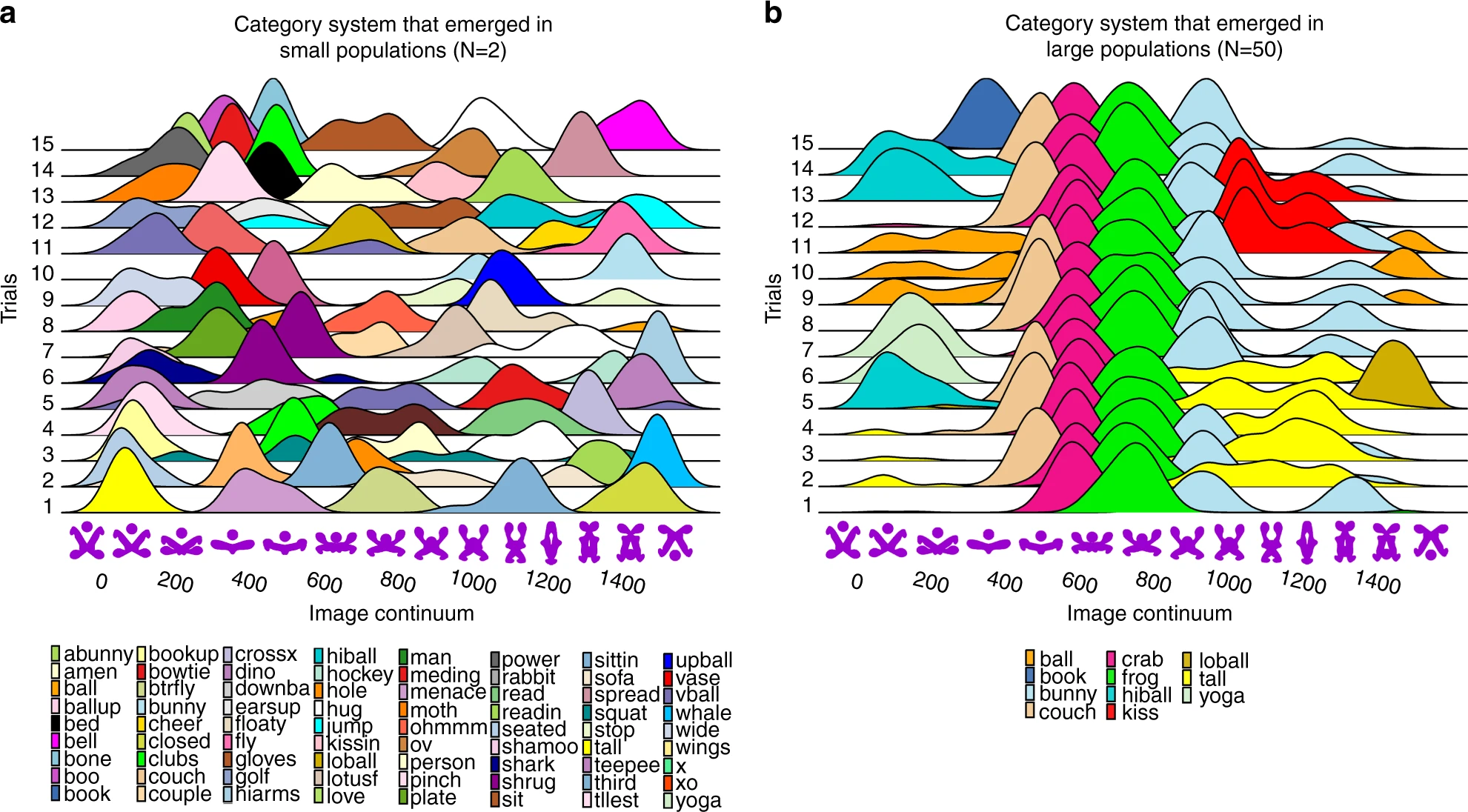
  - Larger populations promote category convergence across populations
    Researchers report that large populations consistently converge on highly similar category systems, relevant to lexical aspects of large communication networks and cultures.

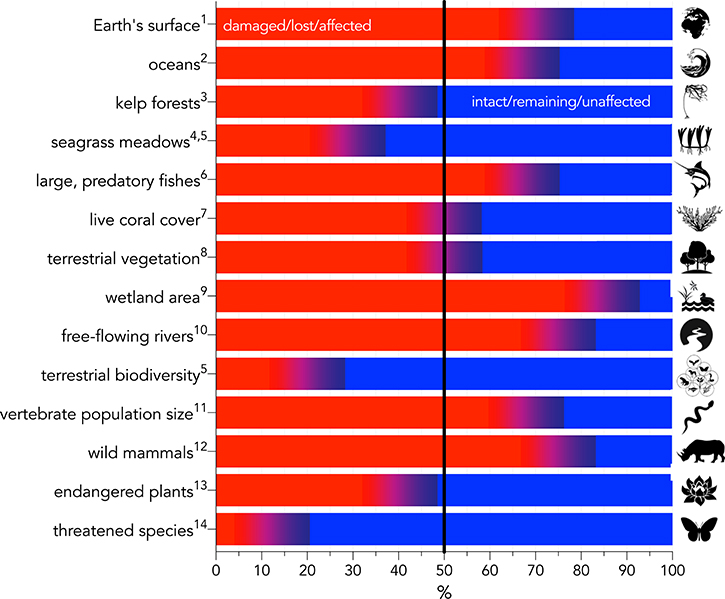
13 January: A group of 17 high-ranking ecologists conclude that current challenges – themselves individually – that humanity faces and which may lead to a "ghastly" future are large and underestimated.

- 13 January
  - A new record high temperature of the world's oceans is reported, measured from the surface level down to a depth of 2,000 metres.
  - In Lyon, France, the first transplant of both arms and shoulders is performed on an Icelandic patient.
  - Astrophysicists report that energy extraction – with high efficiency – from rotating black holes with a high spin via reconnection of magnetic field lines of an externally supplied magnetic field that accelerates escaping plasma particles is possible. Advanced civilizations may be capable of doing so.
  - Scientists report that all glacial periods of ice ages over the last 1.5 M years were associated with northward shifts of melting Antarctic icebergs which changed ocean circulation patterns, leading to more CO_{2} being pulled out of the atmosphere. Authors note that this process may be disrupted as the Southern Ocean may be too warm for the icebergs to travel far enough to trigger these changes or effects.
  - A group of 17 high-ranking ecologists publish a perspective piece that reviews a number of studies that, based on current trends, indicate that future environmental conditions will be far more dangerous than currently believed, concluding that current challenges – themselves in specific – that humanity faces are large and underestimated. The small group cautions that such an "optimism bias" is prevalent and that fundamental changes are required, listing a few of such they consider adequate in the form of broad descriptions in their largely static document, published by a scientific journal.
- 15 January
  - Researchers in China report the successful transmission of entangled photons between drones, used as nodes for the development of mobile quantum networks or flexible network extensions, marking the first work in which entangled particles were sent between two moving devices.
  - Scientists from U.S. federal medical agencies report that gut infections increase its microbiota's resistance to subsequent infections and that this is associated with taurine, whose exogenous supply can induce this microbiota alteration.
- 17 January – LauncherOne becomes the first successful all-liquid-fuelled air-launched rocket to reach orbit.
- 20 January
  - Archaeologists report the discovery of what may be earliest evidence of human use of symbols – a ~120-ky-old bone engraved with six lines.
  - Researchers report that myeloid cells are drivers of a maladaptive inflammation element of brain-ageing in mice and that this can be reversed or prevented via inhibition of their EP2 signalling.
  - Scientists report that the MOTS-c peptide in the mitochondrial genome is an AMPK-related regulator of age-dependent physical decline in mice and that its exogenous supply initiated in late-life can substantially increase their physical performance and healthspans.
- 22 January
  - A study described as the "first long-term assessment of global bee decline", which analyzed GBIF-data of over a century, finds that the number of bee species declined steeply after the 1990s, shrinking by a quarter in 2006–2015 compared to before 1990.
  - COVID-19 pandemic: Preliminary analyses indicate that the SARS-CoV-2 variant of concern detected in the U.K. is associated with an increased severity of disease.

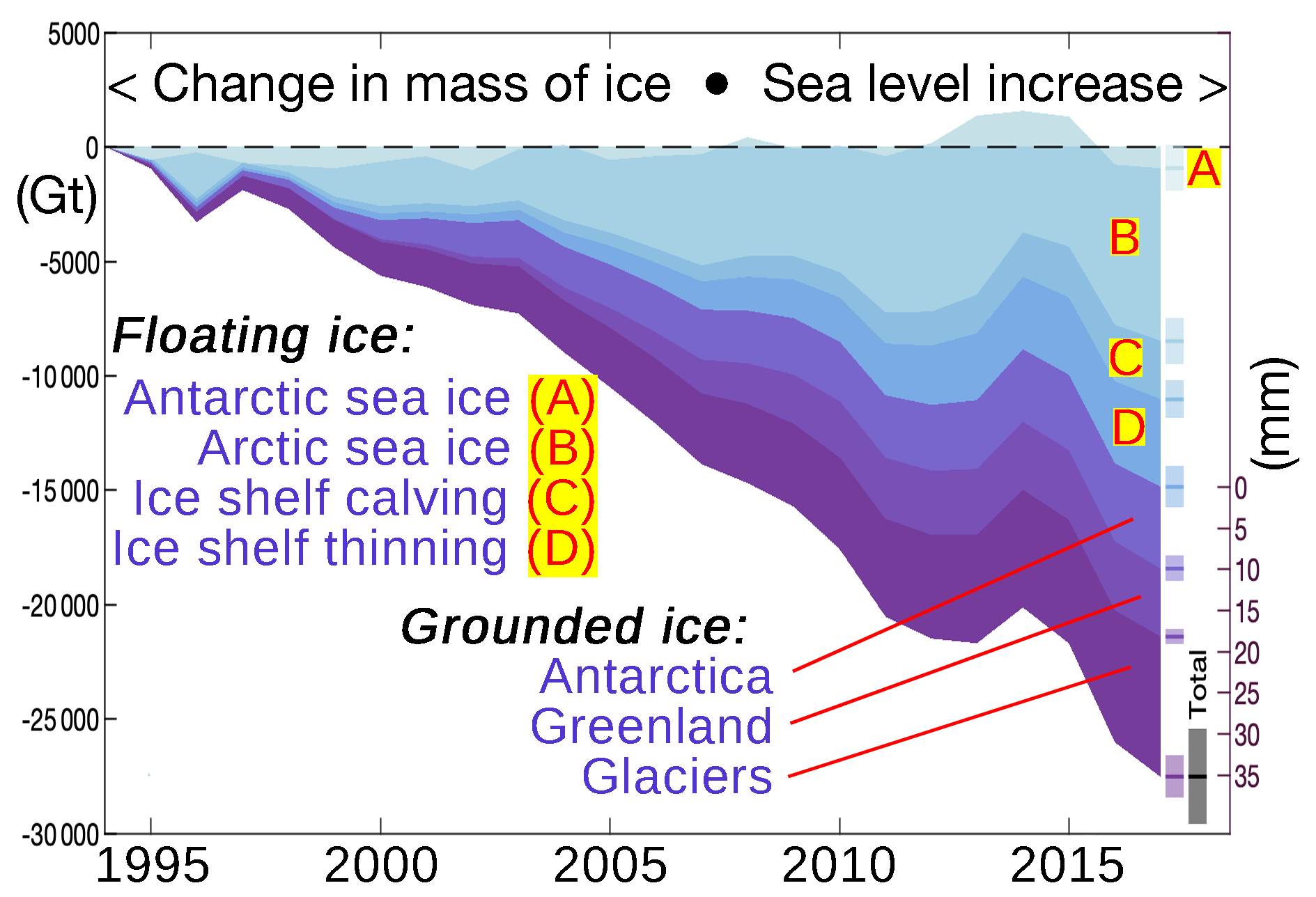
25 January: Global ice loss is found to be accelerating at a record rate in a scientific review, matching the worst-case scenarios of the IPCC.

- 25 January
  - Global ice loss is found to be accelerating at a record rate in a scientific review, matching the worst-case scenarios of the IPCC.
  - Astronomers report the discovery of TOI-178, a rare system of six exoplanets locked in a complex chain of Laplace orbital resonances and variations in the densities that are hard to explain.
  - Australian scientists develop a new cryogenic computer system called Gooseberry, which has potential for scaling up quantum computers from dozens to thousands of qubits.
- 26 January – A study suggests that operating air purifiers or air ventilation systems in confined spaces during their occupancy by multiple people leads to increased airborne virus transmission due to air circulation effects.
- 27 January
  - Researchers report a way to manufacture transparent wood, whose qualities exceed those made with the main process used earlier, that requires substantially less amounts of chemicals and energy – solar-assisted chemical brushing.
  - Scientists report that shark and ray populations have fallen by 71% since 1970 as a result of human actions, primarily overfishing.
- 28 January
  - COVID-19 pandemic: Medical scientists report the first detection of the SARS-CoV-2 Beta variant.
  - Researchers report the development of a highly efficient single-photon source for quantum IT with a system of gated quantum dots in a tunable microcavity which captures photons released from these excited "artificial atoms".

=== February ===
February 2021 in science

Science Summary for this section (February)

- 2 February
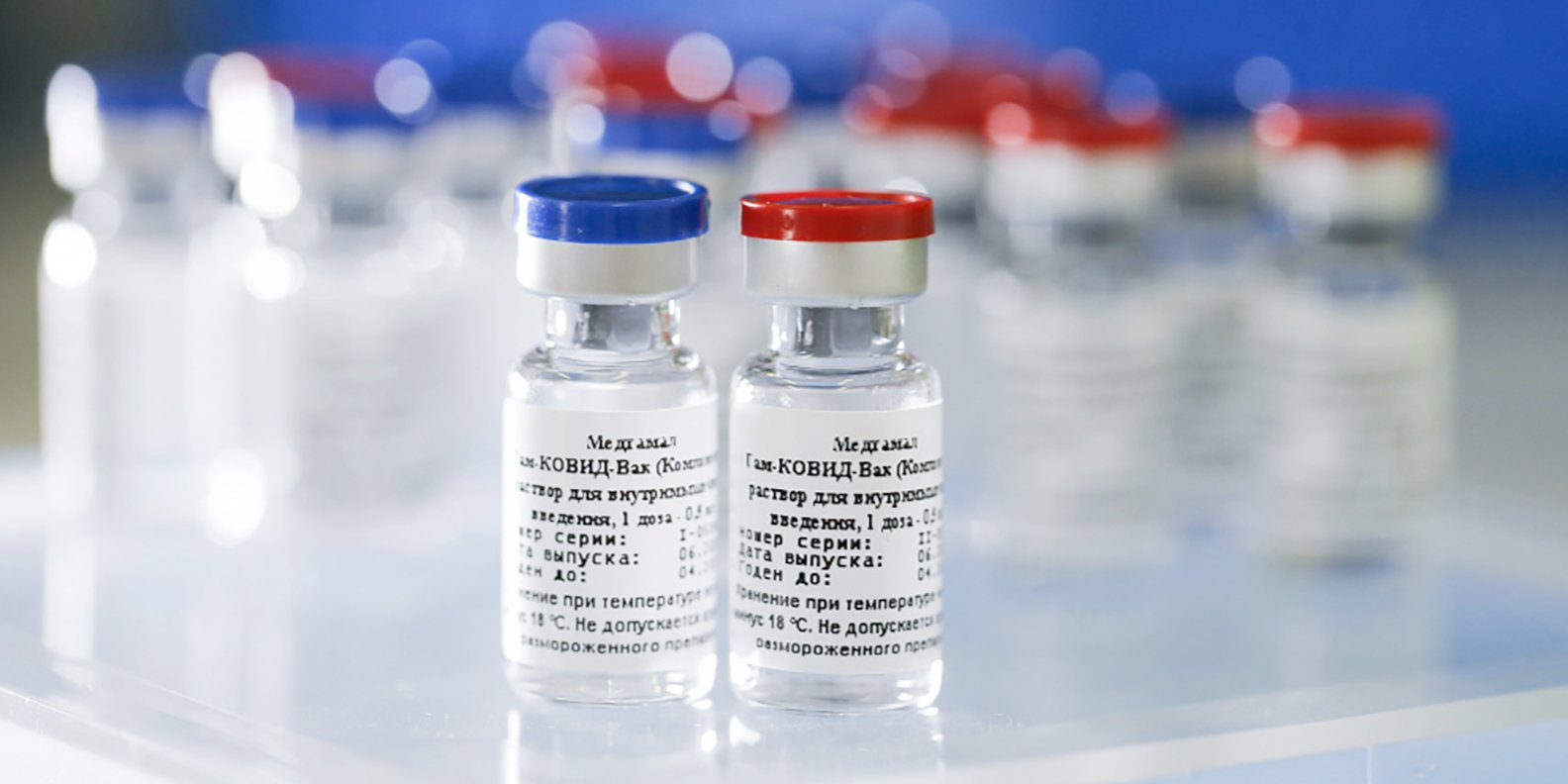
  - 2 February: Effectiveness of Sputnik-V vaccine is shown to be 92%.
    COVID-19 pandemic: Russia's Sputnik V vaccine is shown to be 92% effective against COVID-19, according to late stage trial results published in The Lancet.
  - COVID-19 pandemic: Medical scientists in the United Kingdom report the detection of E484K (in 11 out of 214,000 samples), a mutation of the U.K. coronavirus variant that may compromise current vaccine effectiveness.
  - Astronomers report that Tabby's Star, observed to dim in very unusual ways, has been found to be a binary stellar system.
- 5 February
  - COVID-19 pandemic: A study suggests that climate change may have driven the emergence of SARS-CoV-2, by increasing the growth of forest habitats favoured by bats carrying the virus.
  - A new theory aims to explain ʻOumuamua's peculiarities naturally and estimates, if true, ~4% of astronomical bodies in the interstellar medium to be N_{2} ice fragments.
  - A study identifies genes for face shape and, for the first time, finds that a version of a gene – which was possibly selected for due to adaption to cold climate via fat distribution – is associated with a facial feature, lip thickness, and introgressed from ancient humans – Denisovans – into modern humans, Native Americans.
  - Researchers demonstrate a first prototype of quantum-logic gates for distributed quantum computers.
- 8 February – Scientists report an updated status of studies considering the possible detection of lifeforms on Venus (via of phosphine) and Mars (via methane).
- 9 February
  - The UAE's Hope spacecraft becomes the first Arabian mission to successfully enter orbit around Mars.
  - A study using a high spatial resolution model and an updated concentration-response function finds that 10.2 million global excess deaths in 2012 and 8.7 million in 2018 – or a fifth – were due to air pollution generated by fossil fuel combustion, significantly higher than earlier estimates and with spatially subdivided mortality impacts.
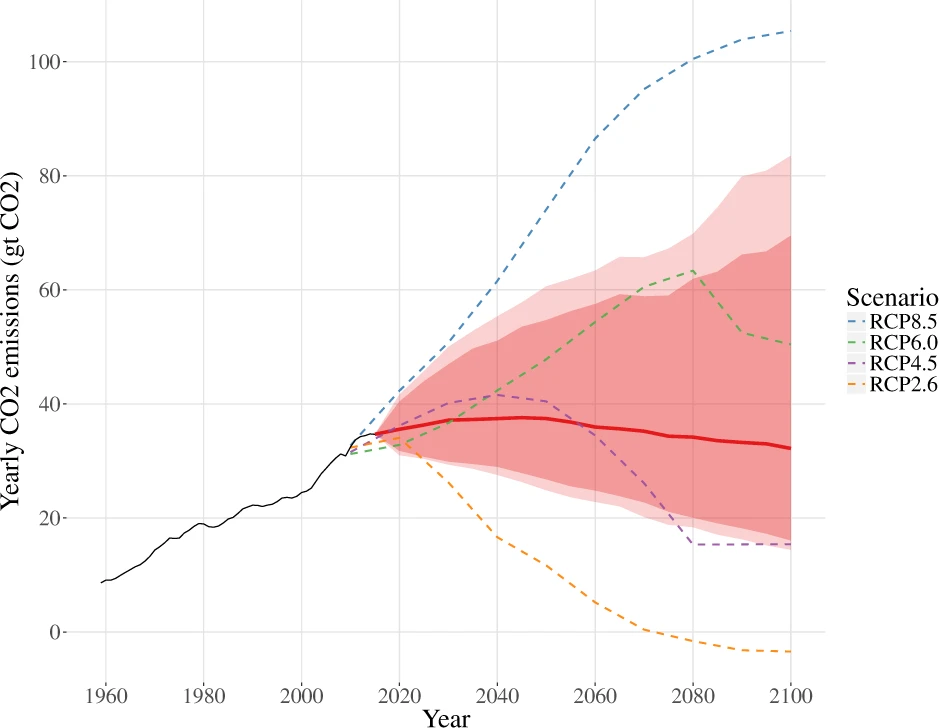
  - 9 February: Updated probabilistic forecast of CO_{2} emissions, based on data to 2015 and the method of Raftery et al.
    A study concludes that the rates of emissions reductions need to increase by 80% beyond NDCs to meet the 2 °C upper target range of the Paris Agreement, that the probabilities of major emitters meeting their NDCs without such an increase is very low, estimating that with current trends the probability of staying below 2 °C of warming is 5% and if NDCs were met and continued post-2030 by all signatory systems 26%.
  - A study finds that air pollution by nitrogen dioxide could be a technosignature by which one could detect extraterrestrial civilizations via "atmospheric SETI".
- 10 February
  - The Chinese Tianwen-1 spacecraft successfully enters orbit around Mars.
  - A journal-accepted preprint suggests observational data for a planet-mass object "Planet 9" at the outer Solar system is not significant and could be selection bias.
  - Scientists deduce in a review that Homo sapiens does not have a single origin in terms of ancestor birthplaces being limited to a small geographic region and that current knowledge about long, continuous and complex – e.g. often non-singular, parallel, nonsimultaneous and/or gradual – emergences of characteristics is consistent with a range of evolutionary histories.
  - Researchers report the development of a wearable thermoelectric generator with characteristics that make it a candidate for devices continuously harvesting body-heat energy and solar energy with applications such as powering wearable electronics.

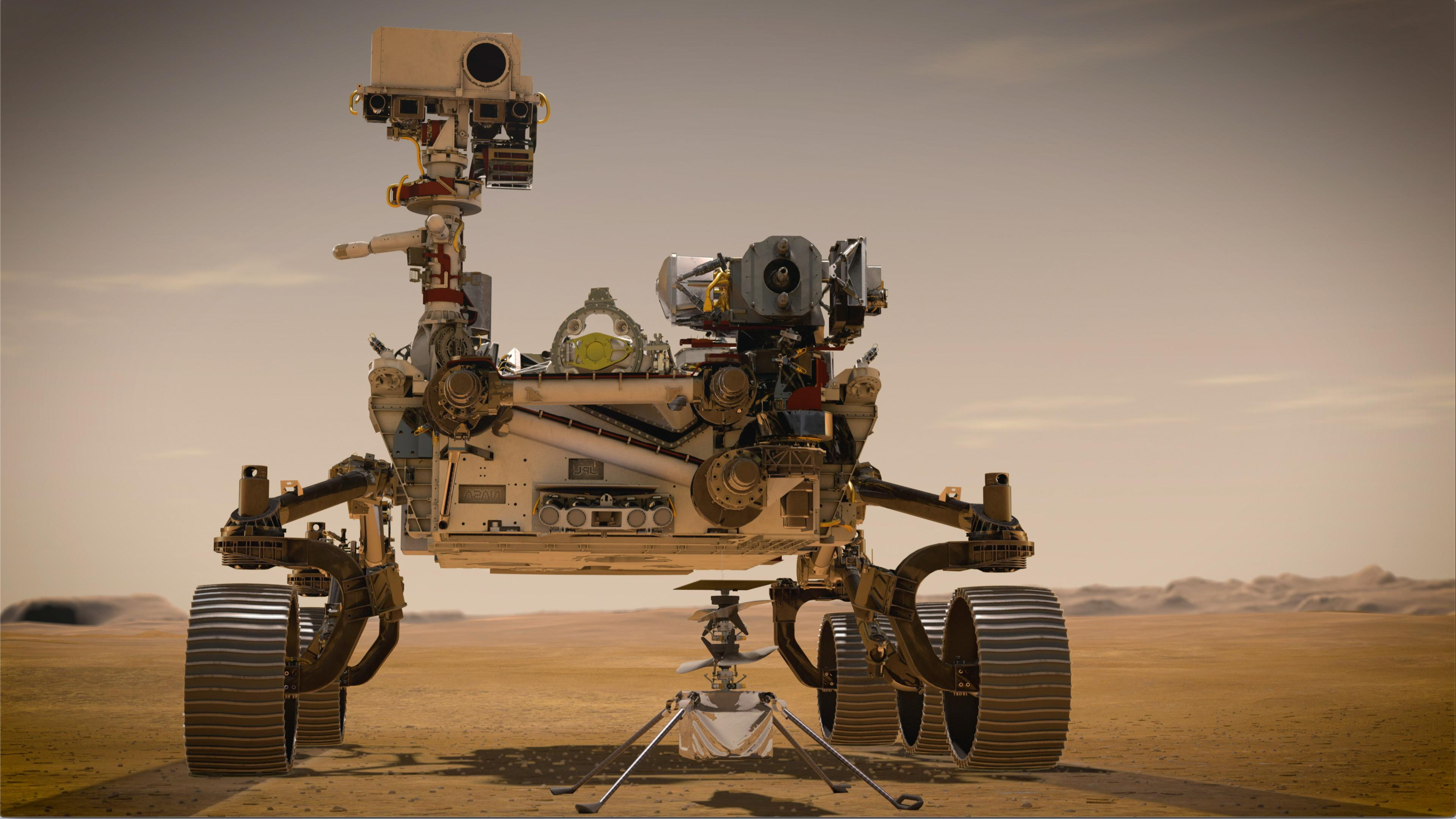
18 February: NASA's Perseverance rover lands on Mars.

- 11 February
  - The core of globular cluster NGC 6397 is found to contain a dense concentration of compact remnants (white dwarfs, neutron stars and black holes), based on new data from the Hubble Space Telescope and the Gaia astrometric mission.
- 12 February
  - Researchers report that brain organoids created with stem cells into which they reintroduced the archaic gene variant NOVA1 present in Neanderthals and Denisovans via CRISPR-Cas9 shows that it has a major impact on neurodevelopment and that such genetic mutations during the evolution of the human brain underlie traits that separate modern humans from extinct Homo species. A subsequent study failed to replicate the differences in organoid morphology between the modern human and the archaic NOVA1 variant, consistent with suspected unwanted side effects of CRISPR editing in the original study.
- 15 February
  - Scientists report that the impactor that led to the demise of the dinosaurs 66 million years ago was a fragment from a disrupted comet, rather than an asteroid which has long been the leading candidate among scientists.
  - Researchers report, for the first time, the detection of lifeforms 872 m below the ice of Antarctica, at a depth of 1,233 m and 260 km from the open water at the Filchner-Ronne Ice Shelf's calving margin.
- 16 February – Global warming is found to cause increases of pollen season lengths and concentrations.
- 17 February – Scientists report the first sequencing of DNA from animal remains more than a million years old – in this case of a mammoth.
- 18 February
  - NASA's Mars 2020 mission (containing the Perseverance rover and Ingenuity helicopter drone) lands on Mars at Jezero Crater, after seven months of travel.
  - Astronomers report that Cygnus X-1, one of the first known black holes in the Milky Way galaxy, is substantially more massive than first thought. This finding challenges the way the evolution of massive stars is understood.
  - Teams of cognitive scientists report having established real-time communication with people undergoing a lucid dream and show that they were able to comprehend questions and use working memory.
- 19 February
  - Scientists report that the short global geomagnetic reversal – a geomagnetic excursion – of Earth's magnetic field ~42,000 years ago – the Laschamp event – in combination with grand solar minima, caused major extinctions and environmental changes and may have contributed to the extinction of the Neanderthals and appearances of cave art. It altered the geographical extension of auroras and levels of harmful radiation worldwide. They term the event which they find to constitute a major enviro-archaeological boundary "Adams Transitional Geomagnetic Event".
  - Thomas Metzinger, a German philosopher of cognitive science and applied ethics, calls for a "global moratorium on synthetic phenomenology" which, "until 2050", precautionarily bans "all research that directly aims at or knowingly risks the emergence of artificial consciousness on post-biotic carrier systems" – and could be gradually refined. The paper does not describe mechanisms of global enforcement of proposed regulations which do not consider biotic or semi-biotic systems and aims to limit suffering risks.
- 22 February – Astronomers release, for the first time, a very high-resolution map of 25,000 active supermassive black holes, covering four percent of the Northern celestial hemisphere, based on ultra-low radio wavelengths, as detected by the LOFAR in Europe.
- 25 February – Researchers confirm that the Atlantic meridional overturning circulation, which includes the Gulf Stream, is at its weakest since about 1,000 years ago, experiencing unprecedented weakening – likely due to global warming – which could result in more extreme weather events – including heatwaves and intense winters – and is moving towards a "tipping point".
- 26 February – COVID-19 pandemic: The Wall Street Journal reports that a purported patient zero of COVID-19 may have been infected by parents who visited a different food market than the Huanan Seafood Wholesale Market that has been thought to be the primary source of the infection earlier.
- 28 February – Winchcombe meteorite: Fragments of a carbonaceous chondrite meteorite, the first known in Britain, fall at Winchcombe in the English Cotswolds.

=== March ===
March 2021 in science

Science Summary for this section

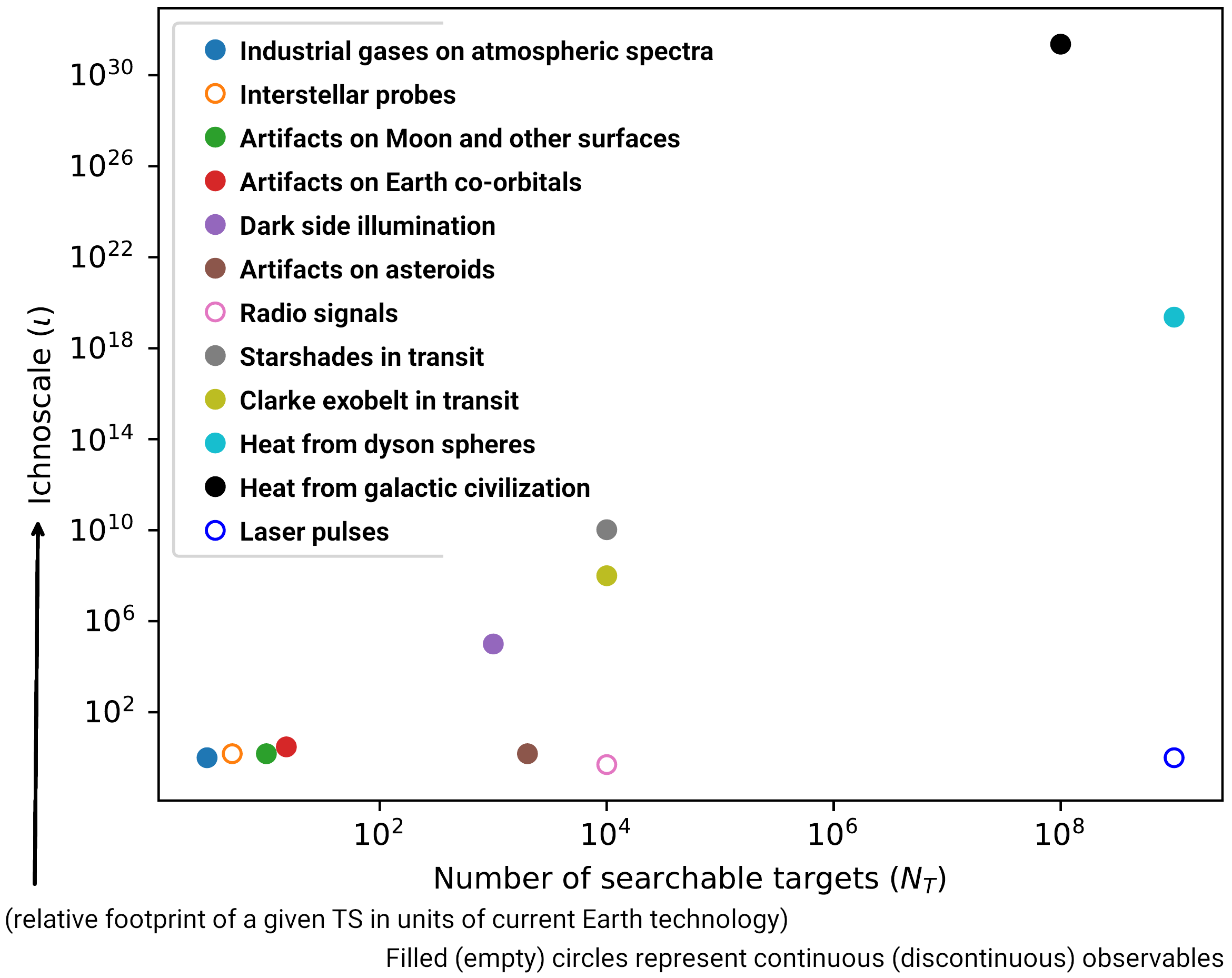
1 March: A review classifies SETI technosignatures.

- 1 March
  - A scientific review produced by the i.a. NASA-sponsored online workshop TechnoClimes 2020 about mission concepts for the search of technosignatures is published. They classify signatures based on a metric about the distance of humanity to the capacity of developing the signature's required technology, associated methods of detection and ancillary benefits of their search. The study's conclusions include robust rationales for searching artifacts within the Solar System.
- 2 March
  - Scientists report substantially more precise and regionally subdivided end times of the Acheulean, finding that it persisted long after the diffusion of Middle Palaeolithic technologies in multiple continental regions and ended over 100,000 years apart.
  - A study of data on half a million U.K. citizens shows associations between meat intake with risks of some of 25 common conditions, including ischaemic heart disease and diabetes, as well as a lower risk of iron deficiency anaemia. A study published on 31 March finds higher intake of processed meat was associated with "a higher risk of mortality and major CVD".
- 3 March
  - COVID-19 pandemic: Scientists report that a much more contagious SARS-CoV-2 variant, Lineage P.1, first detected in Japan, and more recently found in Brazil, as well as in several places in the United States, may be associated with COVID-19 disease reinfection after recovery from an earlier COVID-19 infection.
  - Scientists demonstrate a bioinspired self-powered soft robot for deep-sea operation at the deepest part of the ocean at the Mariana Trench. The robot features artificial muscles and wings out of pliable materials and electronics distributed within its silicone body and could be used for exploration and environmental monitoring.
  - Scientists report the discovery of an endosymbiont, bacteria Azoamicus ciliaticola, of an anaerobic ciliate to which it provides energy in the stored form of ATP. Unlike mitochondria, which play the same role in eukaryotes, it enables its host to breathe nitrate instead of oxygen.
- 4 March – COVID-19 pandemic: Scientists report a problematic COVID-19 variant, less susceptible to vaccines, a combination of British B.1.1.7 and South African E484K (Eeek) mutations, in the state of Oregon.
- 5 March – NASA names the landing site of the Perseverance rover in Jezero crater as "Octavia E. Butler Landing".
- 8 March
  - Astronomers report the discovery of a quasar known as P172+18, the most distant source of radio emissions known to date, some 13 billion light years away.
  - Scientists propose storing DNA and other biological reproductive structures in a "lunar ark" on the Moon of all 6.7 million species of plants, animals and fungi known on Earth – to help assure their survivability over the years.
  - Study results indicate that limiting global warming to 1.5 °C would prevent most of the tropics from reaching the wet-bulb temperature of the human physiological limit.
  - A new global food emissions database indicates that food systems are responsible for one third of the global anthropogenic GHG emissions.
  - Scientists report that some of Elysia marginata sea slugs can shed and regenerate their parasitised whole body from their head which is capable of photosynthesis.

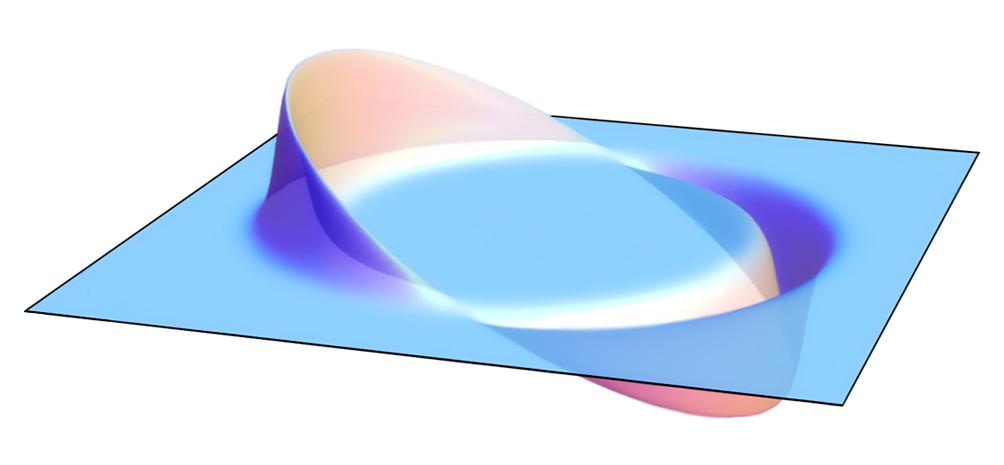
9 March: Erik Lentz describes a way warp drives sourced from known and familiar purely positive energy could exist.

- 9 March
  - Physicists report that according to their theoretical model traversable microscopic wormholes may be possible and not require any exotic matter. Another study published on the same day finds that humanly traversable wormholes may be possible if reality can broadly be described by the Randall–Sundrum model 2, which is a brane-based theory consistent with string theory.
  - A physicist describes a way warp drives sourced from known and familiar purely positive energy could exist – warp bubbles based on superluminal self-reinforcing "soliton" waves. It may allow for up to Faster-than-light speed travel, transfers and communication with the large energy requirements possibly being reducible.
  - Scientists use novel lipid nanoparticles to deliver CRISPR genome editing into the livers of mice, resulting in a 57% reduction of LDL cholesterol levels.
- 10 March
  - Researchers describe a CRISPR-dCas9 epigenome editing method for a potential treatment of chronic pain, an analgesia that represses Na_{v}1.7 and showed therapeutic potential in three mouse models of pain.
  - COVID-19 pandemic: A cohort study of patients matched by similarity finds that the probability of increased mortality from VOC-202012/01 is high, increasing from 0.25 to 0.41% in the low-risk group of the database without controlling for U.K. vaccination campaign effects. A study published on 15 March estimates the strain's mortality-risk to be ~61% (42–82%) higher than that of pre-existing variants.
  - An analysis of the leaked and allegedly manipulated data about COVID-19 vaccines indicates concerns over percentage of intact mRNA in early commercial batches of mRNA vaccines, possibly reflecting a lack of certainty that relates to their efficacy at the time.
  - A new microscopy technique using a hyperbolic metamaterial is shown to boost imaging resolutions, from 200 nanometres down to 40 nanometres.

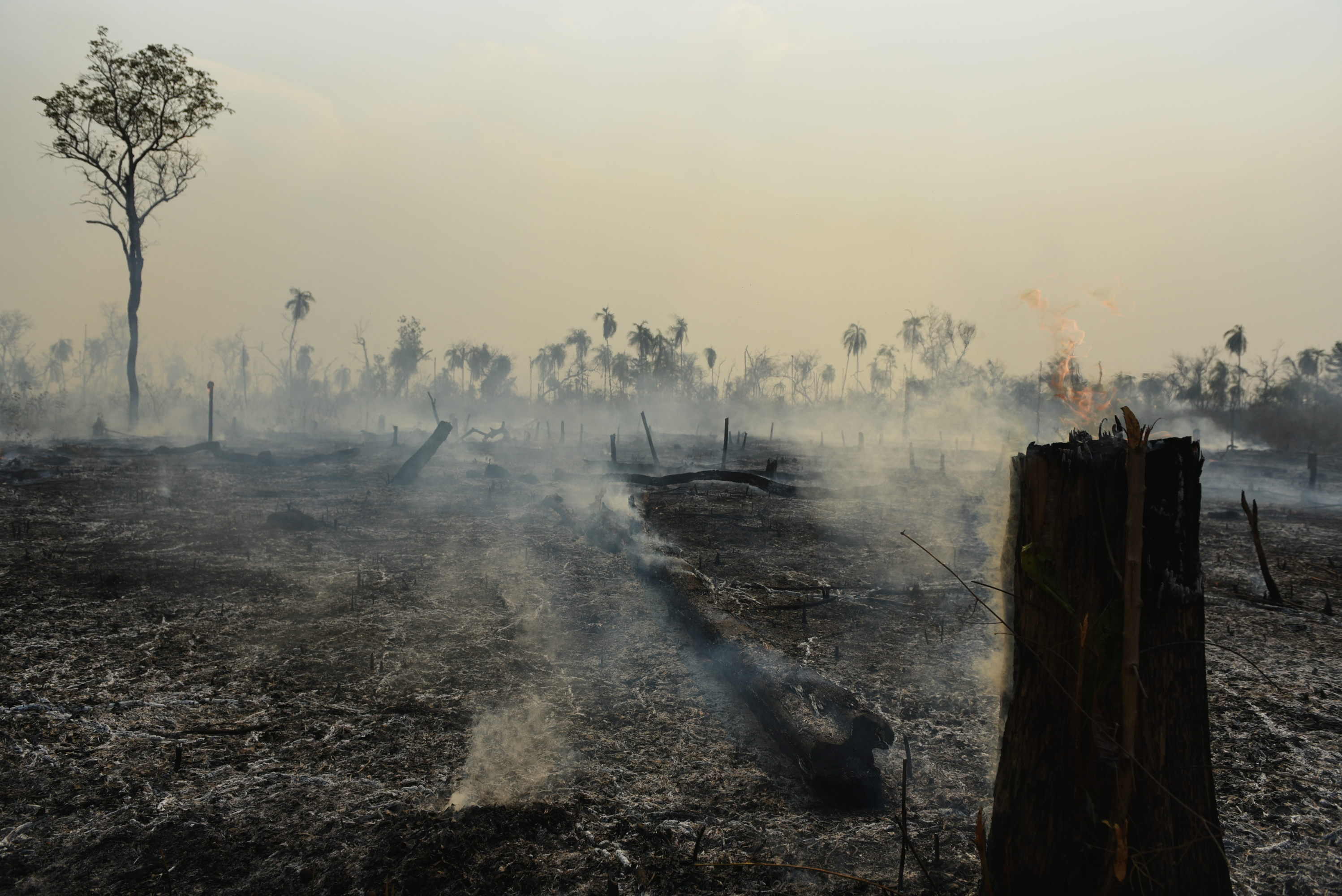
11 March: A review finds that the Amazon basin currently emits more greenhouse gases than it absorbs overall.

- 11 March – Results of a scientific synthesis indicate that, in terms of global warming, the Amazon basin with the Amazon rainforest now emits more greenhouse gases than it absorbs overall due to climate change impacts and human activities in the area – mainly deforestation.
- 15 March – Scientists report the discovery of a new unknown bacteria species, for the first time, of Methylobacterium, tentatively named Methylobacterium ajmalii, associated with three new strains, designated IF7SW-B2T, IIF1SW-B5, and IIF4SW-B5, on the International Space Station.
- 16 March – Scientists present evidence that the interstellar object ʻOumuamua may likely be a piece of a planet similar to Pluto from beyond the Solar System, ejected ~0,5 bn years ago.
- 17 March – A study finds that an optimized globally coordinated marine conservation could be "nearly twice as efficient as uncoordinated, national-level" planning and estimates that bottom trawling releases as much CO_{2}-emissions as pre-COVID-19 aviation.
- 18 March – A study finds that the severity of heatwave and drought impacts on crop production roughly tripled over the last 50 years in Europe.

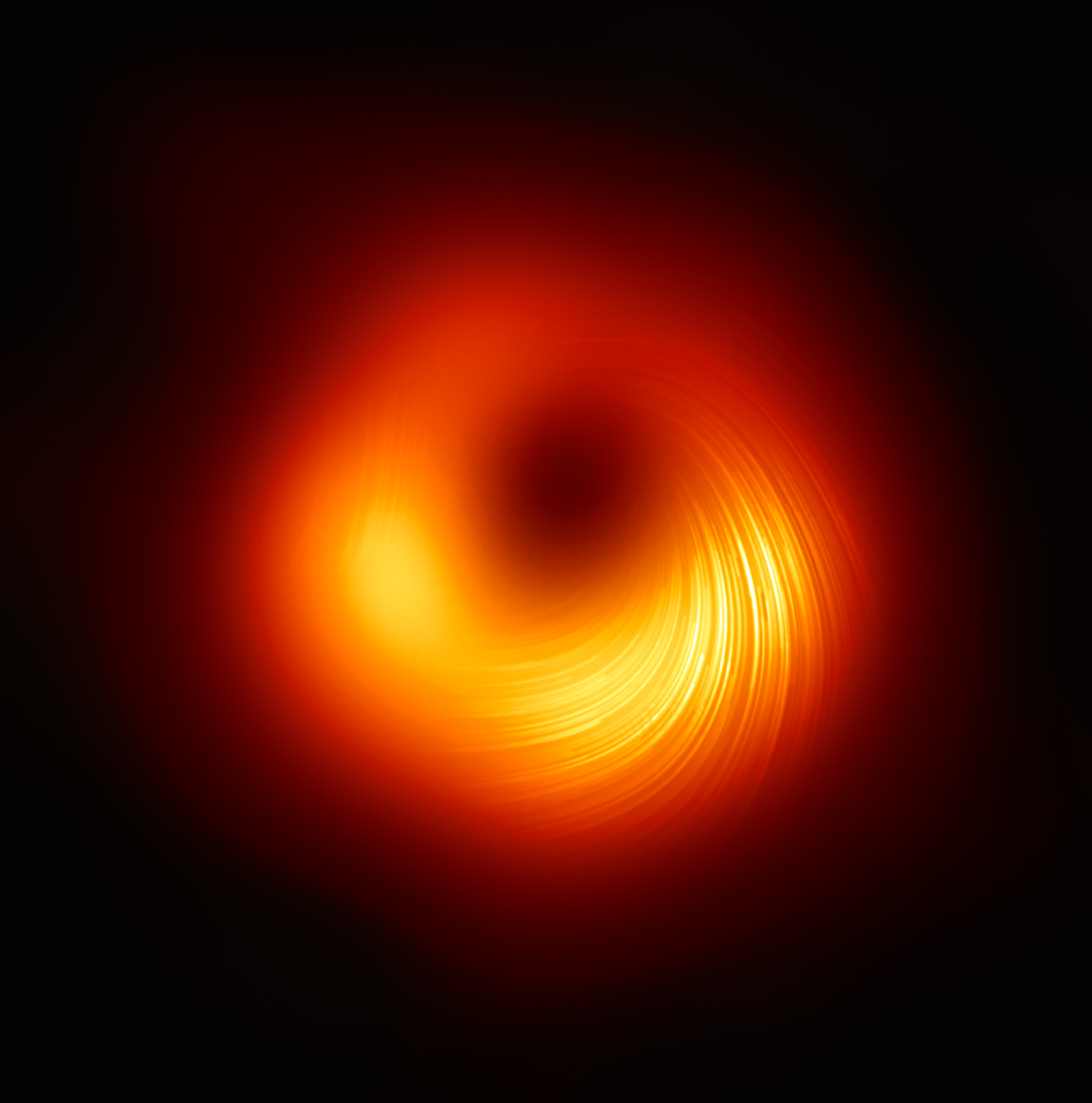
24 March: A view of the M87* supermassive black hole in polarised light

- 19 March
  - NASA reports, based on measurements of over 500 Marsquakes by the InSight lander on the planet Mars, that the core of Mars is between 1,810 and 1,860 km (1,120 and 1,160 mi), about half the size of the core of Earth, and significantly smaller – suggesting a core of lighter elements – than thought earlier.
  - Physicists confirm the first detection of an odderon, based on data collected from CERN's Large Hadron Collider.
- 22 March – Astronomers report, for the first time, that the area producing pulses of a repeating fast radio burst (FRB), particularly FRB 180916, is about 1 kilometre (0.62 miles) in scale, based on studies at extremely short timescales.
- 23 March
  - News media announces the public release, for the first time, of a comprehensive report of UFO events accumulated by the United States over the years.
  - COVID-19 pandemic: A study finds that the snapshot mass-testing for COVID-19 of ~80% of Slovakia's population during a weekend at the end of October 2020 was highly efficacious, decreasing observed prevalence by 58% within one week and 70% compared to a hypothetical scenario of no snapshot-mass-testing.
- 24 March
  - A collaboration of scientists using the Event Horizon Telescope present the first polarized-based image of a black hole, at the center of Messier 87, revealing the forces giving rise to quasars.
  - Scientists report that a delayed change in the shape of early brain cells causes the distinctly large human forebrain compared to other apes and identify a genetic regulator of it, ZEB2.
- 26 March – A collision between the asteroid 99942 Apophis and Earth is ruled out, for at least the next hundred years, based on new observations by NASA.
- 29 March
  - Tokamak Energy announces "first plasma" with its newly-upgraded prototype fusion reactor, the ST40.
  - A study estimates that the national trade-, production- and consumption-patterns of the G7 drive an average annual loss of 3.9 trees per capita.
  - A case-control study of cities finds that redistributing street space for cycling infrastructure – for so-called "pop-up bike lanes" – during the COVID-19 pandemic lead to large additional increases in cycling.
  - The extensive pesticide pollution risks worldwide are estimated with a new environmental model.
- 30 March – Scientists report evidence of subglacial sediment stored since 1966 that indicates that Greenland was ice-free and vegetated at least once within the last million years.
- 31 March
  - The first high-bandwidth, wireless brain-computer interface is demonstrated, with 200 electrodes providing 48 megabits per second (Mbit/s) of neural signals.
  - The first 3D atomic imaging of an amorphous solid is presented, showing the 18,000 atoms in a particle of metallic glass.
  - A report about the leading causes of death in the U.S. for 2020 is published.

=== April ===
April 2021 in science

Science Summary video for this section

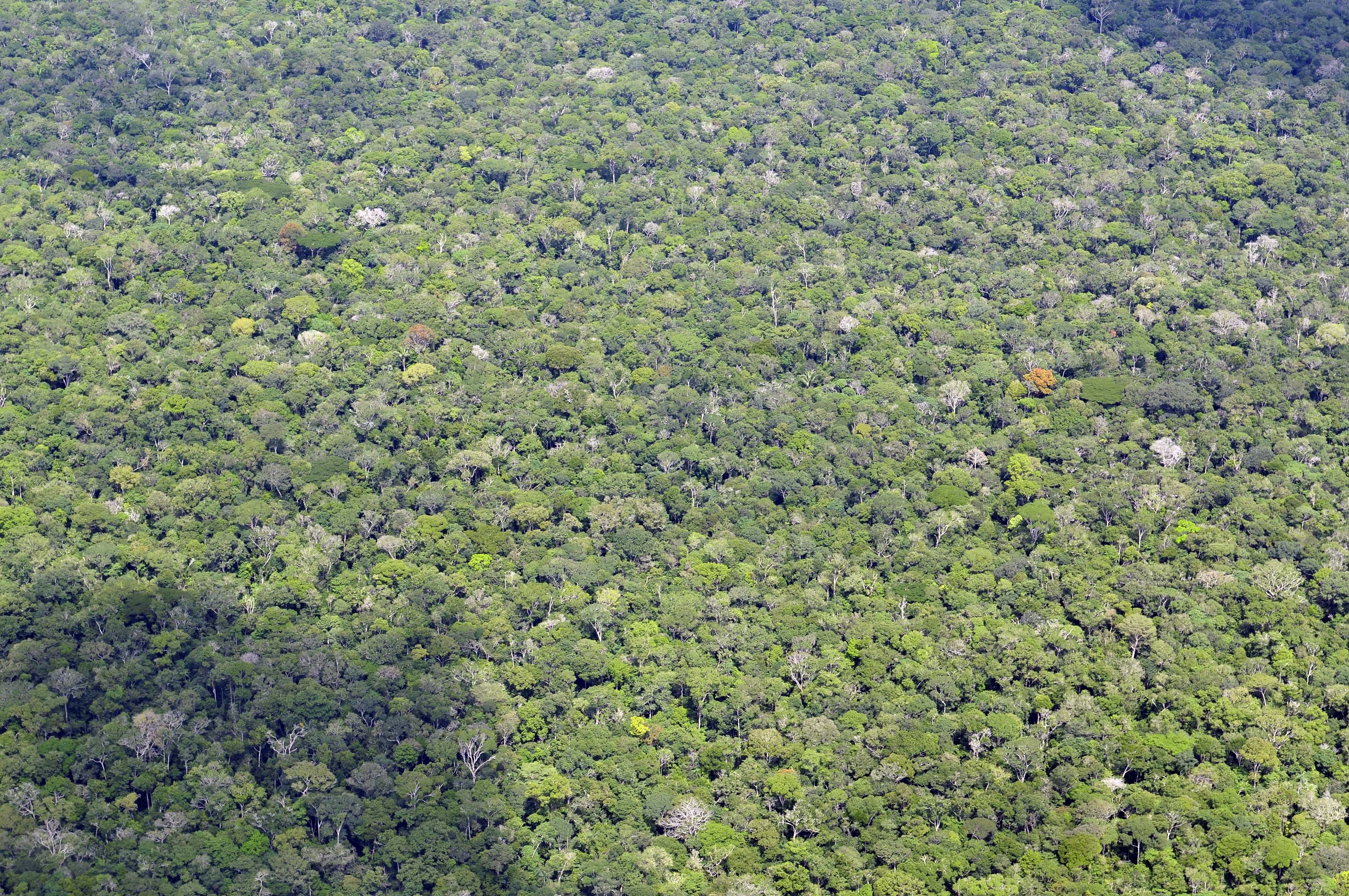
2 April: Scientists describe how the dinosaur-killing impact is an origin of neotropical rainforests like the Amazonia and replaced its species composition.

- 2 April – Scientists report that the event that caused the mass-extinction of non-avian dinosaurs gave rise to neotropical rainforest biomes like the Amazonia, replacing species composition and structure of local forests. During ~6 million years of recovery to former levels of plant diversity, they evolved from widely spaced gymnosperm-dominated forests to the forests with thick canopies which block sunlight, prevalent flowering plants and high vertical layering as known today.

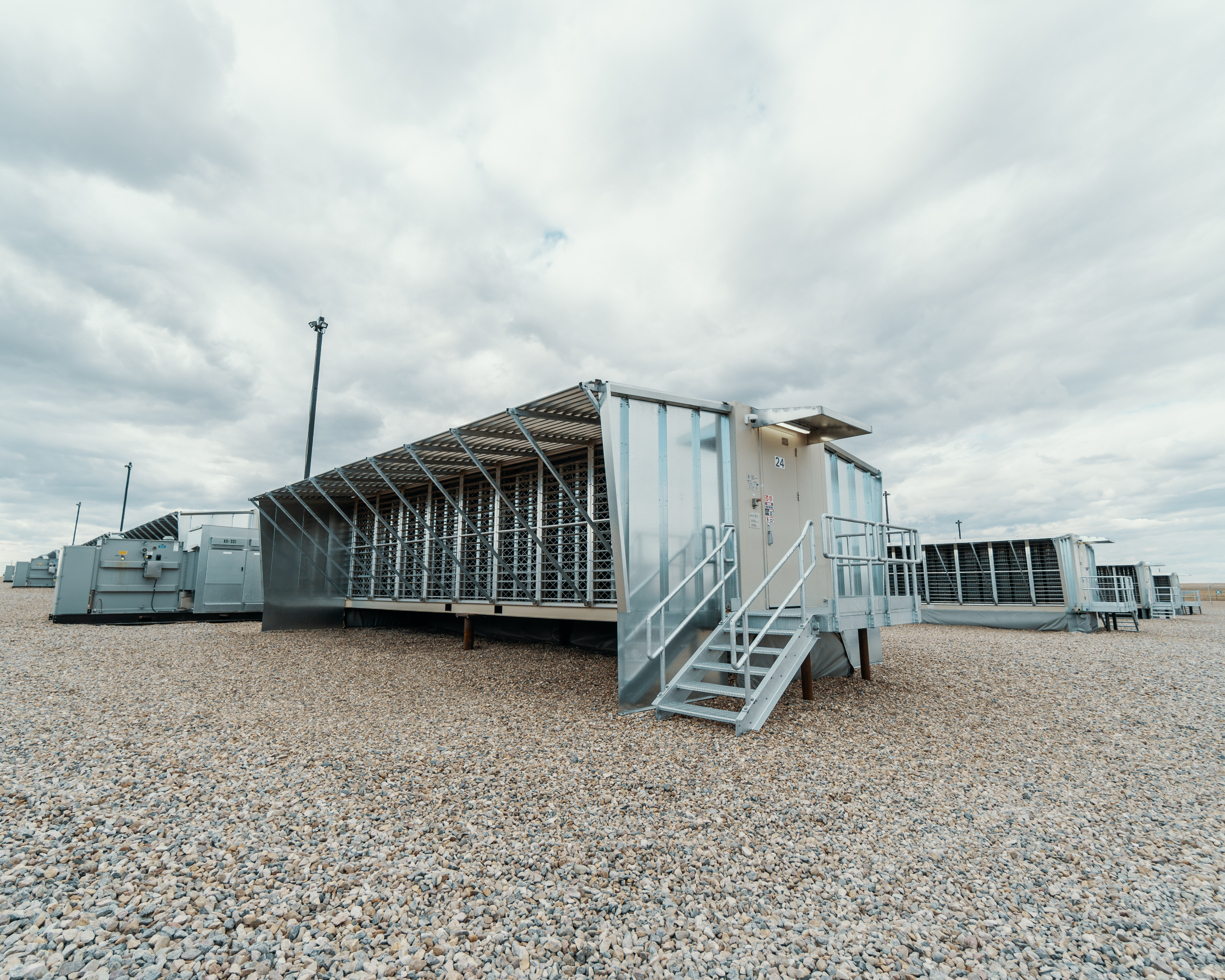
6 April: A study finds that carbon emissions from Bitcoin mining within China are about to exceed the total annual carbon emissions of countries like Italy (within an estimated ~3 years).

- 6 April
  - A study finds that carbon emissions from Bitcoin mining in China – where a majority of the proof-of-work algorithm that generates current economic value is computed, largely fueled by nonrenewable sources – have accelerated rapidly, would soon exceed total annual emissions of European countries like Italy and Spain in 2016 and interfere with climate change mitigation commitments.
  - COVID-19 pandemic: Scientists report the "estimated incidence of a neurological or psychiatric diagnosis in the following 6 months" after diagnosed COVID-19 infection was 33.62% with 12.84% "receiving their first such diagnosis" and higher risks being associated with COVID-19 severity.

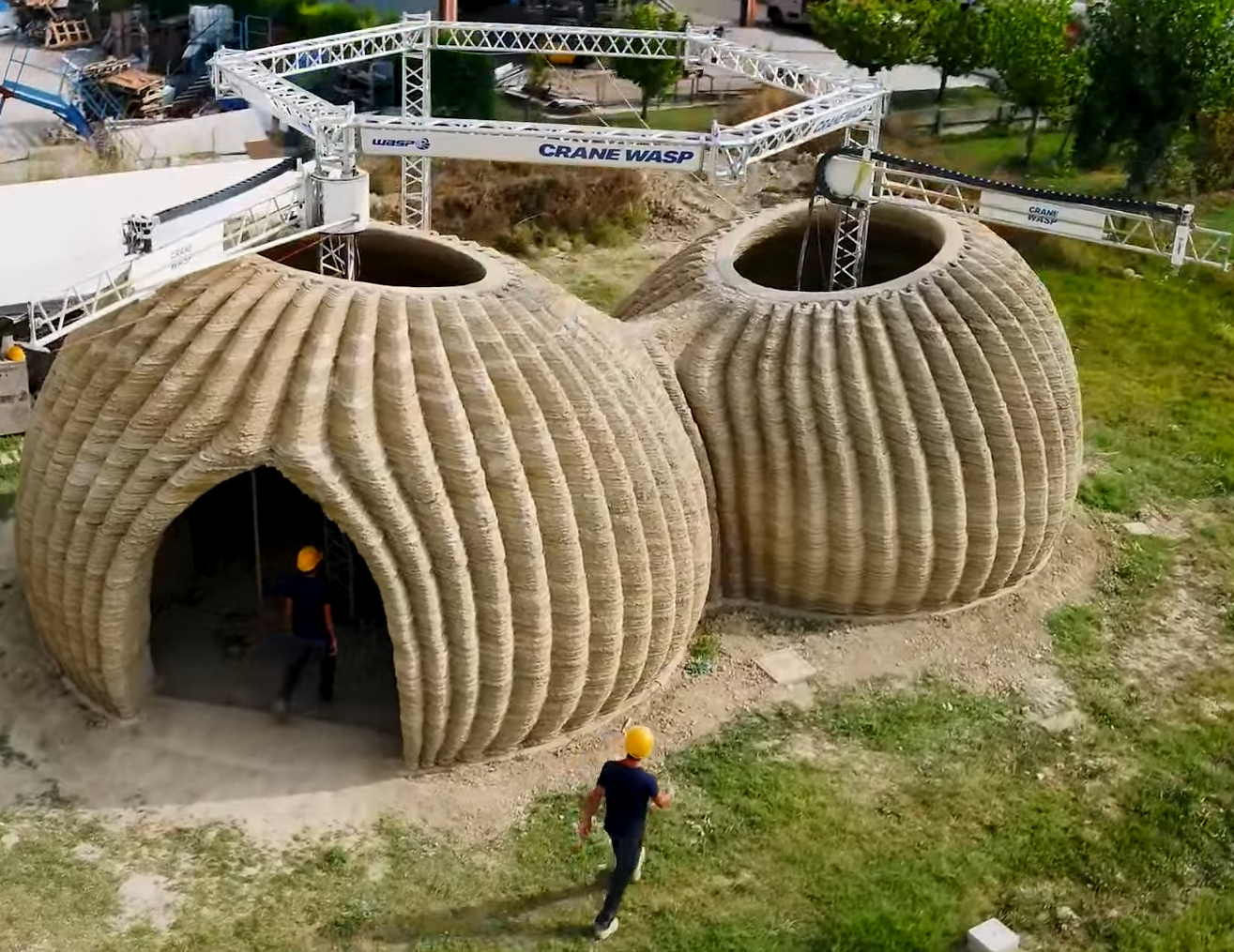
12 April: The construction of the first (eco-)house 3D printed from clay, Tecla, is completed.

- 7 April
  - Physicists report that results from muon g-2 studies involving the muon subatomic particle challenge the Standard Model and, accordingly, may require an updating of currently understood physics.
  - NOAA reports the largest annual increase in methane emissions since records began, with a rise of 14.7 parts per billion (ppb) in 2020.
  - A study finds that humans engaged in problem-solving tend to overlook subtractive changes, including those that are critical elements of efficient solutions. This tendency to solve by creating or adding elements is shown to intensify with higher cognitive loads in the case of individuals.
  - Scientists report one of the two oldest known reconstructed modern human genomes to date (~45.000 ya) which was found in Koněprusy Caves, Czech Republic, includes long Neanderthal segments and considered to be close to a population that later branched to present-day Europeans and Asians.
  - Scientists confirm, with new genomic data, that initial European modern humans mixed with Neanderthals with continuity to later people in Eurasia and report that such admixture appears to have been more common than previously thought.
- 8 April – Scientists report rough spectral signatures of 958 molecules that may be involved in the atmospheric production or consumption of phosphine, which could prevent misassignments and, if accuracy is improved, be used in future detections and identifications of molecules on other planets such as Venus. On 10 April, a news report informs about a launched NASA-funded mission to design and test robotic balloons for future scientific exploration of Venus. On 19 April scientists who reported the detection of well-established or likely biosignature, monophosphine, on Venus publish a preprint recovering the detection of PH_{3} in the Venusian atmosphere – which was challenged by critical studies – with the proposed SO_{2}-attribution alternative being inconsistent with the available data.
- 9 April
  - Neuralink reveals a male macaque with chips embedded on each side of its brain, playing a mind-controlled version of Pong.
  - Scientists show that the brains of early Homo from Africa and Dmanisi, Western Asia "retained primitive, great ape-like organization of the frontal lobe" until ~1.5 million years ago and therefore long after Homo emerged and first dispersed from Africa – much later than previously thought (~2.5 Mya).
  - Scientists present a tool for epigenome editing, CRISPRoff, that can heritably silence the gene expression of "most genes" and allows for reversible modifications.
- 12 April
  - The magazine Scientific American announces that it will stop using the term "climate change" in articles about human-caused global warming and substitute "climate emergency" instead.
  - News outlets report that the first prototype 3D printed house made out of clay, Tecla, has been completed. The low-carbon housing was printed by two large arms from a mix that includes locally sourced soil and water. Such buildings could be highly cheap, well-insulated, stable, get produced rapidly, require only very little easily learnable manual labor, mitigate carbon emissions from concrete, require less energy, reduce homelessness, help enable intentional communities, and enable the provision of housing for victims of natural disasters as well as for migrants to Europe near their homes, rather than political facilitation of their influx.
  - Scientists develop a prototype and design rules for both-sides-contacted silicon solar cells with conversion efficiencies of 26% and above, Earth's highest for this type of solar cell.
- 13 April
  - Scientists report the discovery of a billion-years-old, likely holozoan, protist, Bicellum brasieri, showing that the evolution of differentiated multicellularity – such as of animal lineages – occurred at least 1 bn years ago and possibly mainly in freshwater lakes rather than the ocean.
  - In a preprint, an astronomer describes for the first time how one could search for quantum communication transmissions sent by ETI using existing telescope and receiver technology. He also provides arguments for why future searches of SETI should also target interstellar quantum communications.
  - COVID-19 pandemic: Scientists report that patients who consistently met scientific guidelines of 150+ min/week exercise or similar physical activity had a smaller risk of hospitalisation and death due to COVID-19, even when considering likely risk factors such as elevated BMI.
- 14 April – Astronomers report that the supermassive black hole M87*, first, and to date, the only black hole to be imaged, will be further studied by many observatories from around the world and present results of simultaneous observations and their subsequent analysis.

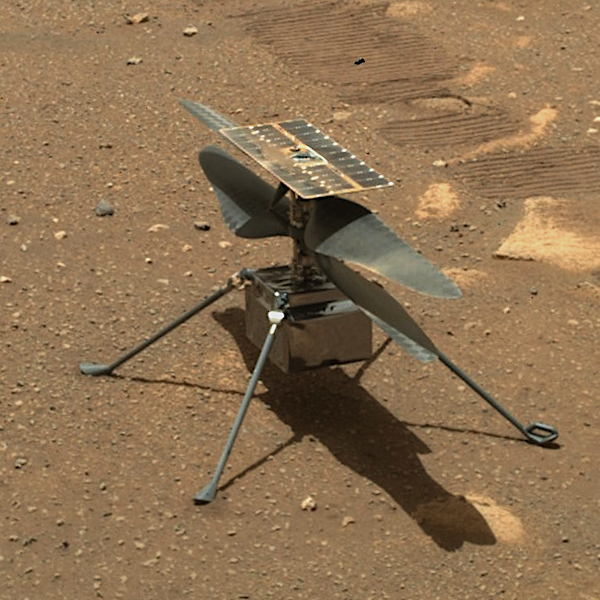
19 April: The semi-autonomous Mars helicopter Ingenuity performs the first powered aircraft flight on another planet in human history.

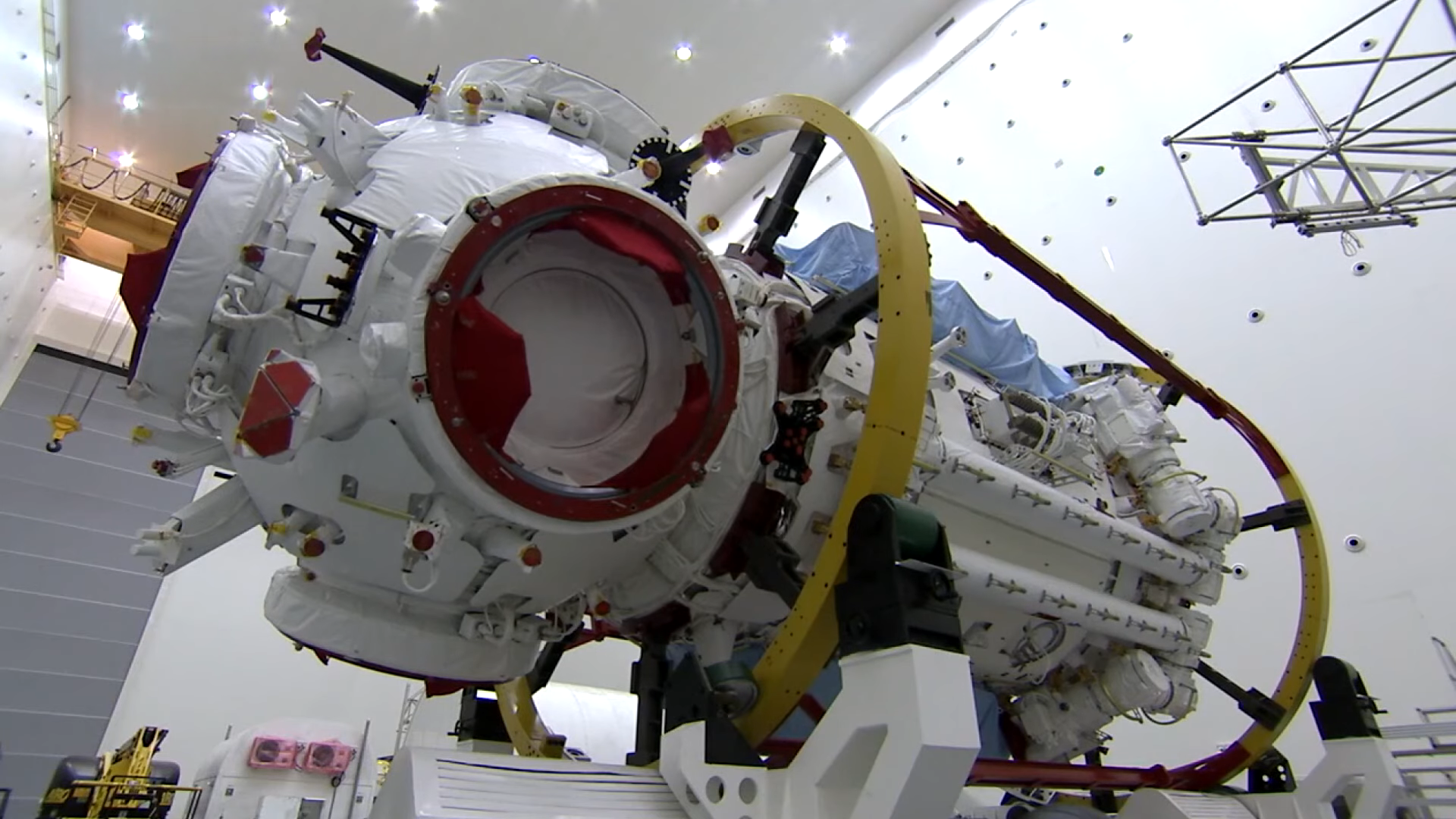
29 April: The first, core module of the Chinese Tiangong space station is put into orbit.

- 15 April
  - COVID-19 pandemic: The CDC, according to numerous media sources, reports that there were 5,800 COVID-19 breakthrough infections, and 74 deaths, in people fully vaccinated for the COVID-19 virus. On 21 April, scientists report that in a cohort of 417 vaccinated persons 2 women had vaccine breakthrough infections and identify their variants' viral mutations.
  - Scientists report the creation, for the first time, of human-monkey hybrid embryos.
  - Biologists report that an estimated 2.5 billion adult Tyrannosaurus rex dinosaurs roamed the Earth over the 2.4 million years of their existence.
  - A study assesses that only 3% of the planet's terrestrial surface is ecologically and faunally "intact", with low human footprint and healthy populations of native animal species.
  - Researchers demonstrate the whitest ever paint formulation, which reflects up to 98.1% of sunlight and could be used in place of air conditioners.
- 16 April – Scientists report that in the case of Alaskan forests, such boreal forests recovered from wildfires by shifting to a deciduous-coniferous mix, which could offset the carbon emitted during the fires.
- 17 April – New Horizons reaches a distance of 50 astronomical units (AU) from the Sun, while remaining fully operational.
- 19 April – NASA's Ingenuity helicopter, part of the Mars 2020 mission, performs the first powered aircraft flight in history not to take place on earth. The test location is named "Wright Brothers Field".
- 20 April
  - Perseverance performs a test of its MOXIE instrument to convert carbon dioxide into oxygen for the first time on Mars.
  - The Ivanti Pulse Connect Secure data breach of unauthorized access to the networks of high-value targets since at least June 2020 via CVE-2021-22893 across the U.S. and some E.U. nations due to their use of vulnerable, proprietary software is reported.
  - Scientists show that a class of warp drives that are slower than light, could control the rate of time within the spaceship and are sourced from positive energy could in principle possibly be constructed based on known physical principles. Furthermore, they provide a new argument "why superluminal warp drive solutions may always violate weak energy conditions" and that the concept proposed in a study published in March "likely forms a new class of warp drive spacetimes".
- 23 April
  - A malaria vaccine with 77% efficacy after 1 year – and first to meet the WHO's goal of 75% efficacy – is reported by the University of Oxford.
  - Scientists report that of ~39 million groundwater wells 6-20% are at high risk of running dry if local groundwater levels decline by a few meters, or – as with many areas and possibly more than half of major aquifers – continue to decline.
- 27 April – Astronomers report the discovery of TOI-1431b, an "ultra-hot Jupiter" with a dayside temperature of ~3,000K (2,700 °C), making it one of the hottest exoplanets found to date.
- 29 April – The first, core module of the Chinese Tiangong space station, Tianhe, is placed in low Earth orbit. It is one of three permanent modules intended to be fully assembled in 2022 for a designed lifespan of 10–15 years, is 16.6 m in size and could host three astronaut scientists.

=== May ===
May 2021 in science

Science Summary video for this section

- 1 May
  - A study that follows up on the randomized Abecedarian Early Intervention Project shows that 5 years of cognitively and linguistically stimulating center-based care starting between 3 and 21 weeks of age can result in significant changes in midlife brain structure in males.
  - A meta-analysis of randomized trials suggests that lowering blood pressure at normal or high-normal blood pressure ranges is effective for prevention of major cardiovascular disease.
- 4 May
  - Genetic signatures linked to extreme longevity in humans are identified by researchers and include genes for efficient DNA repair.
  - A study assesses benefits of fast action to reduce methane emissions when compared to slower climate change mitigation of this form. On 6 May a U.N. report assesses benefits and costs of rapidly mitigating methane emissions.
- 5 May – Scientists report that Mediterranean diets protect against memory decline and mediotemporal atrophy such as in Alzheimer's by decreasing amyloidosis and tau-pathology.
- 6 May
  - Researchers find that China's CO_{2} emissions surpassed that of all OECD countries combined for the first time in 2019. On 20 May China's CO_{2} emissions are found to be 9% higher than pre-COVID-19-pandemic levels in 2021-Q1 with CO_{2} emissions from fossil fuels and cement production having grown by 14.5% compared to 2020.
  - Researchers report that bees were successfully trained to detect COVID-19 infections via samples.
  - Researchers publish the first in-depth study of Web browser tab interfaces in over a decade and provide UI design considerations.
- 7 May
  - Operation of the U.S. Colonial Pipeline is interrupted by a ransomware cyber intrusion.
  - Researchers address a key problem of perovskite solar cells by increasing their stability and long-term reliability with a form of "molecular glue".
  - Two studies complement research published September 2020 by quantum-entangling two mechanical oscillators.
- 10 May – A pan-coronavirus mRNA nanoparticle vaccine with activity against all major SARS-CoV-2 variants is described in Nature, showing potent effect in macaques.
- 11 May
  - NASA reports on the continuous measurement, for the first time, of the density of material in interstellar space by the Voyager 1 space probe and the detection of interstellar sounds of vibrations of dense interstellar plasma.
  - A new record for the smallest single-chip system is achieved, occupying a total volume of less than 0.1 mm^{3}.
  - Scientists estimate, with higher resolution data, that land-use change has affected 17% of land in 1960–2019, or when considering multiple change events 32%, "around four times" previous estimates and investigate its drivers.
  - News reports inform about open source oxygen concentrators of which some are developed, locally manufactured – with prices below imported products – and used during a COVID-19 pandemic wave in India.
  - Scientists report that degrowth scenarios, where economic output either "declines" or declines in terms of contemporary economic metrics such as current GDP, have been neglected in considerations of 1.5 °C scenarios reported by the IPCC, finding that investigated degrowth scenarios "minimize many key risks for feasibility and sustainability compared to technology-driven pathways" with a core problem of such being feasibility in the context of contemporary political decision-making and rebound- and relocation-effects.
- 12 May
  - Scientists report to the United States Congress of the continuing threat of COVID-19 variants and COVID-19 escape mutations.
  - The first use of a brain-computer interface to decode neural signals for handwriting is demonstrated and shows a character output speed of more than double the previous record.
- 14 May
  - The China National Space Administration lands its Zhurong mission spacecraft at Utopia Planitia on Mars, making China the second nation to deliver a rover to the planet.
  - Archivists initiate a rescue mission to secure enduring access to humanity's largest public library of scientific articles, Sci-Hub, due to the site's increased legal troubles, using Web and BitTorrent technologies.
- 17 May – The largest, UK Biobank-based, genome-wide association study of mitochondrial DNA unveils 260 new associations with phenotypes including lifespan and disease risks for e.g. type 2 diabetes.
- 18 May – Google demonstrates a research project called LaMDA, an automatic language generation system designed to sustain a conversation with a person on any topic.
- 19 May – CRISPR gene editing is demonstrated to decrease LDL cholesterol in vivo in Macaca fascicularis by 60%.
- 20 May – A new record high resolution for atomic imaging is reported, with instrumental blurring reduced to less than 20 picometres.
- 21 May – A study finds that papers in leading journals with findings that can't be replicated tend to be cited more than reproducible science. Results that are published unreproducibly are more likely to be wrong, may slow progress and, according to an author, "a simple way to check how often studies have been repeated, and whether or not the original findings are confirmed" is needed.
- 24 May – Researchers partially restore eyesight of a patient with Retinitis pigmentosa using eye-injected viral vectors for genes encoding the light-sensing channelrhodopsin protein ChrimsonR found in glowing algae, and light stimulation of them via engineered goggles that transform visual information of the environment.
- 25 May
  - Scientists at Japan's RIKEN institute demonstrate a "dry transfer technique" enabling the precise positioning of optical-quality carbon nanotubes, without the need for a solvent.
  - The maximum lifespan for humans is placed at between 120 and 150, according to a longitudinal analysis of blood markers.
  - Scientists elaborate mechanics of memory consolidation during sleep which may allow purposely enabling or strengthening this reactivation of experiences and information.
- 26 May
  - Scientists develop a light-responsive days-lasting modulator of circadian rhythms of tissues via Ck1 inhibition which may be useful for chronobiology research and repair of organs that are "out of sync".
- 27 May – The U.S. Department of Energy launches Perlmutter, a next-generation supercomputer with four exaflops of AI performance, the world's fastest when measured by 16-bit and 32-bit mixed-precision math.
- 28 May
  - Biologists report the development of a new updated classification system for cell nuclei and find a way of transmuting one cell type into that of another.
  - China's EAST tokamak sets a new world record for superheated plasma, sustaining a temperature of 120 million °C for 101 seconds and a peak of 160 million °C for 20 seconds.
- 29 May – Medical scientists in Vietnam report a new, more contagious, form of the COVID-19 virus, that may be a mixture of the variants first detected in India and Britain.
- 30 May – The most comprehensive 3D map of the human brain – of a 1 mm^{3} sized millionth of a brain and requiring 1.4 petabytes of storage space – is published.

=== June ===
June 2021 in science

Science Summary podcast based on this section

- 2 June
  - NASA selects DAVINCI+ and VERITAS, two proposed spacecraft to study the atmosphere and surface of Venus, as the next missions in its Discovery Program.
  - A new study provides experimental evidence of asymmetric response of interfacial water to applied electric field by using a single layer graphene electrode and a novel surface-sensitive non-linear spectroscopy technique with implications for various water-related processes such as in water purification.
  - Scientists report that COVID-19 caused substantial changes to blood cells, sometimes persisting for months after hospital discharge, with implications for COVID-19 diagnostics and treatment.
- 3 June – Scientists report that due to decreases in power generation efficiency of wind farms downwind of offshore wind farms, cross-national limits and potentials for optimization need to be considered in strategic decision-making.

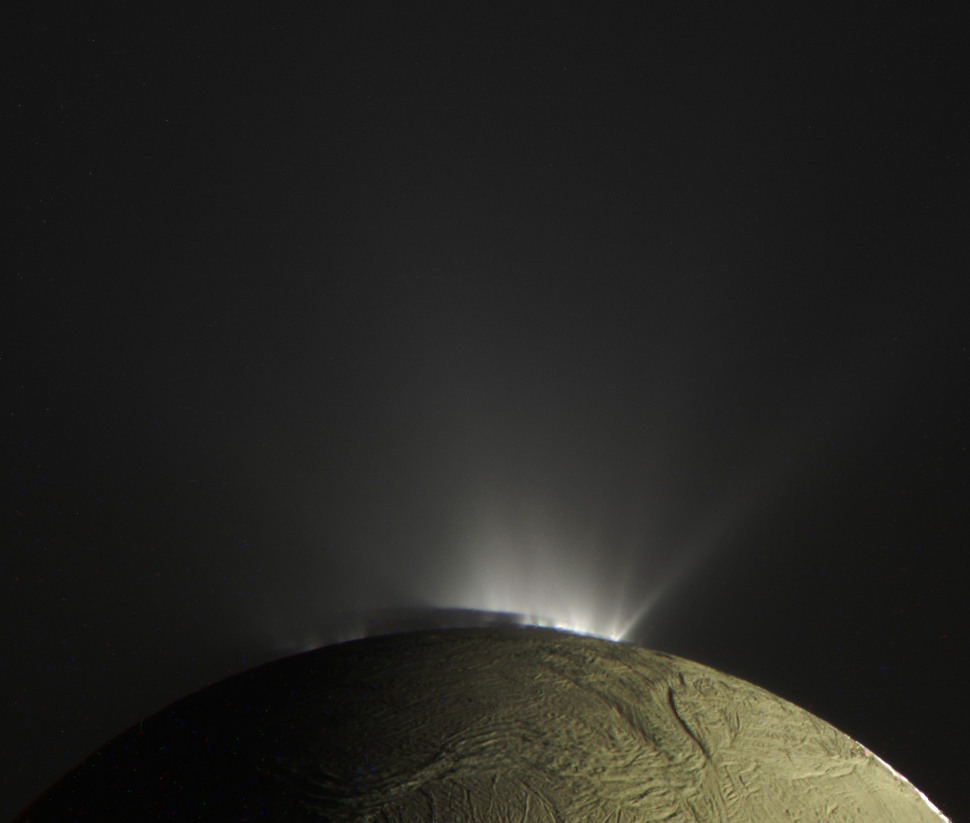
7 June: Astronomers report detecting substantial amounts of methane, a possible sign of microbial life, on Enceladus.

- 7 June
  - Astronomers report detecting substantial amounts of methane, a possible sign of microbial life, on Enceladus, a moon of the planet Saturn.
  - Biologists report the restoration of bdelloid rotifers after being frozen for ~24,000 years in the Siberian permafrost.
  - The Juno spacecraft performs its only flyby of Jupiter's moon Ganymede, the first flyby of the moon by any spacecraft in over 20 years.
- 8 June – Toshiba achieves quantum communications over optical fibres exceeding 600 km in length, a new world record distance.
- 9 June
  - Astronomers at the Canadian Hydrogen Intensity Mapping Experiment (CHIME) report the detection of over 500 Fast Radio Bursts from outer space.
  - Researchers from Google report a machine learning approach for microchip floorplanning that can outperform human designers.
  - Researchers report the development of quantum nonlinear light microscopy with higher sensitivity and beyond the biological photodamage limit.

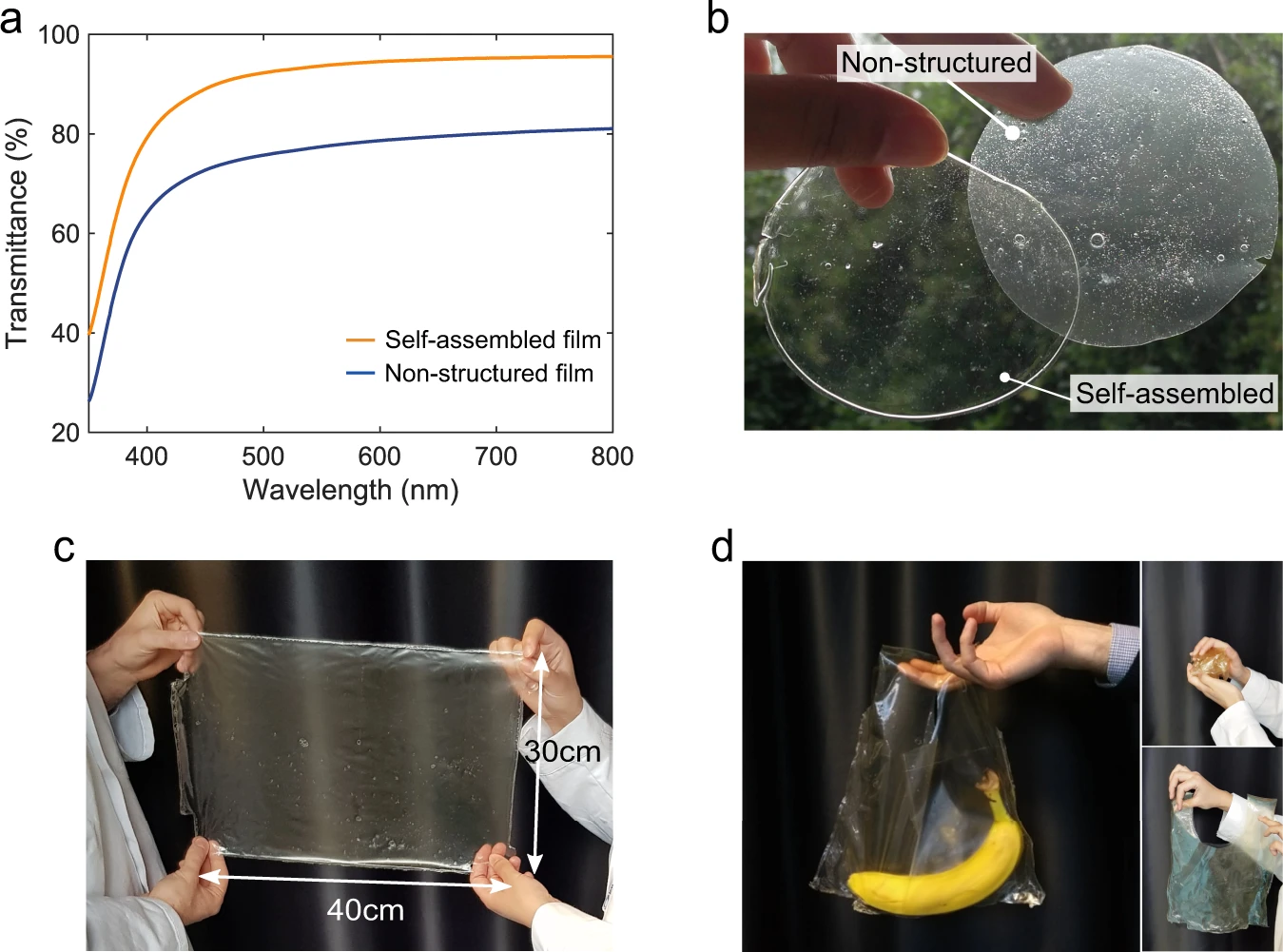
10 June: Researchers report the development of a plant proteins-based biodegradable packaging alternative to plastic molecularly similar to high-strength spider silk.

- 10 June
  - A trial of mosquitoes infected with Wolbachia bacteria results in a 77% reduction of dengue fever incidence and 86% reduction of hospitalisations in Yogyakarta, Indonesia.
  - A Venus-orbiting spacecraft, EnVision, is chosen by the European Space Agency as the fifth Medium-class mission in its Cosmic Vision plan, targeting a launch in the early 2030s.
  - Researchers report the development of the first quantum brain scanner which uses magnetic imaging and could become a novel whole-brain scanning approach.
  - Researchers report the development of a plant proteins-based biodegradable packaging alternative to plastic molecularly similar to high-strength spider silk.

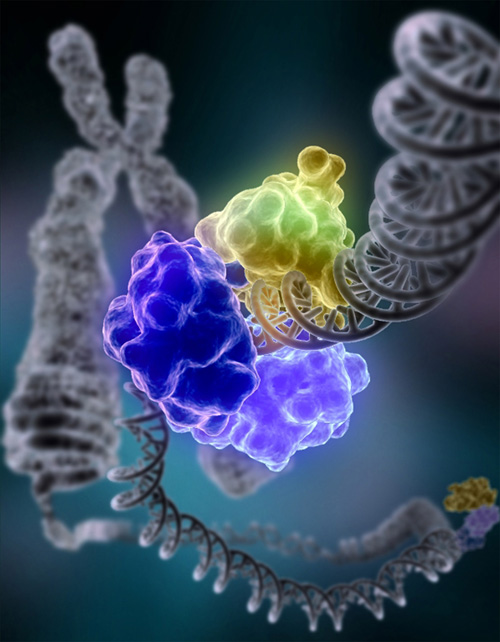
11 June: Biologists report that DNA polymerases, long thought to only transcribe DNA into DNA or RNA, can also write RNA segments into DNA.

- 11 June – Biologists report that DNA polymerases, long thought to only transcribe DNA into DNA or RNA, can also write RNA segments into DNA. Polθ was found to promote RNA-templated DNA repair, with large implications for many fields of biology.
- 14 June – Astronomers describe the largest known spinning structures in the Universe, consisting of "tendrils" of galaxies spanning hundreds of millions of light-years in length.

15 June: Scientists complement extensive evidence that cosmetics are widely designed with formulations and disposals that are harmful to human health and ecosystems, often containing PFAS.

- 15 June
  - Scientists report measurements of the rapidly increasing rate of the Earth's energy budget imbalance of global warming.
  - Scientists complement extensive evidence that cosmetics are widely designed with formulations and disposals that are harmful to human health and ecosystems, often containing PFAS.
- 16 June – Astronomers report that the Great Dimming of Betelgeuse, a red supergiant star, resulted from expulsion of a substantial amount of dust from the star, and not a sign of its destruction.
- 17 June
  - The first, three-person crew is sent to the Chinese space station Tiangong, which to date consists of the first and core module Tianhe.
  - Researchers present a quantum computing demonstrator that fits inside two 19-inch racks, the world's first quality standards-meeting compact quantum computer.
- 18 June – The existence of a "pulse" in Earth's geological activity, occurring approximately every 27.5 million years, is reported. The next pulse is due in about 20.5 million years.
- 19 June – A previously unknown comet, 2014 UN271, is reported by astronomers at the Dark Energy Survey. The object is estimated at between 100 and 200 km in size, potentially making it the largest comet ever discovered, and will pass as close as Saturn in January 2031.
- 23 June
  - Astronomers report the determination of 1,715 stars (with likely related exoplanetary systems) within 326 light-years (100 parsecs) that have a favorable positional vantage point—in relation to the Earth Transit Zone (ETZ)—of detecting Earth as an exoplanet transiting the Sun since the beginnings of human civilization (about 5,000 years ago).
  - A study finds that over half of a cohort of home-isolated young patients (16–30 y.) infected with COVID-19 still had symptoms after 6 months, including fatigue (21%).
- 24 June – Astronomers provide a new calculation for when the first stars formed, placing this event between 250 and 350 million years after the Big Bang.
- 25 June
  - Chinese archaeologists report that a skull discovered in Harbin in 1933 by a Manchukuo National Railway bridge, known as Homo longi or "Dragon Man", belongs to a previously undiscovered species of early humans closely related to Homo sapiens dating back 146,000 years ago.
  - The first comprehensive analysis of a Nesher Ramla Homo individual (120–140 kya) suggests an unrecognized group of hominins may have existed and, admixed with Neanderthals, was involved in the evolution of Middle Pleistocene Homo in Europe and East Asia.
  - Scientists report that natural immunity to COVID-19 via forms of prior infection combined with vaccination synergizes to extraordinarily large immune responses.
- 26 June – The first, small clinical trial of CRISPR gene editing in which a – lipid nanoparticle formulated – CRISPR (with mCas9) gene editing therapeutic is injected in vivo into bloodstream of humans concludes with promising results.
- 28 June
  - Scientists publish calculations of water activity levels in Venusian clouds based on data from space probes, concluding these to be two magnitudes too low at the examined places for a natural microbiotic explanation for potentially detected phosphine on Venus.
  - Researchers report the development of embedded biosensors for pathogenic signatures – such as of SARS-CoV-2 – that are wearable such as face masks.
- 29 June
  - The first detection of a neutron star–black hole collision is reported, with a second such event following 10 days later.
  - A study concludes that public services are associated with higher human need satisfaction and lower energy requirements while contemporary forms of economic growth are linked with the opposite. Authors find that the contemporary economic system is structurally misaligned with goals of sustainable development and that to date no nation can provide decent living standards at sustainable levels of energy and resource use. They provide analysis about factors in social provisioning and assess that improving beneficial provisioning-factors and -infrastructure would allow for sustainable forms of sufficient need satisfaction.
  - Scientists report that solar-energy-driven production of microbial foods from direct air capture substantially outperforms agricultural cultivation of staple crops in terms of land use.
- 30 June
  - The smallest and most massive white dwarf ever seen is reported. The star, named ZTF J1901+1458, has a diameter of just 4,300 km but is 1.35 times the mass of the Sun.
  - A study of the Laacher See volcano uses dendrochronology and radiocarbon dating to narrow the time of the eruption to 13,006 BP with an error of just 9 years, and shows that the onset of the Younger Dryas happened synchronously over the entire North Atlantic and Central European region.

=== July ===
Science Summary podcast based on this section

- 1 July
  - Construction begins on the Square Kilometre Array, with first light planned for 2027.
  - In the debate about the cognitive impacts of smartphones and digital technology a group reports that, contrary to widespread belief, scientific evidence doesn't show that these technologies harm biological cognitive abilities and that they instead only change predominant ways of cognition – such as a reduced need to remember facts or conduct mathematical calculations by pen and paper outside contemporary schools. However, some activities – like reading novels – that require long attention spans and don't feature ongoing rewarding stimulation may become more challenging in general.
  - A study finds that ~9.4% of global deaths between 2000 and 2019 – ~5 million annually – can be attributed to extreme temperature with cold-related ones making up the larger share and decreasing and heat-related ones making up ~0.91 % and increasing.
- 2 July
  - The first scientific review in the professional academic literature about global plastic pollution in general finds that the rational response to the "global threat" would be "reductions in consumption of virgin plastic materials, along with internationally coordinated strategies for waste management" – such as banning export of plastic waste unless it leads to better recycling – and describes the state of knowledge about "poorly reversible" impacts.
  - Researchers report that a mix of microorganisms from cow stomachs could break down three types of plastics.
  - Scientists identify GPR75 variants as alleles protective against obesity in ~640,000 sequenced exomes.
- 5 July
  - Scientists report the discovery of a bone carving, one of the world's oldest works of art, made by Neanderthals about 51,000 years ago.
  - A scientific review summarizes evidence from nutrition research for diets for atherosclerosis prevention.
- 7 July
  - A preprint finds the SARS-CoV-2 Delta variant to cause a ~108 % increased – or more than twice as large – risk for hospitalization, a ~234 % increase for ICU admission and 132% for death compared to non-VOC variants.
  - Researchers present a programmable quantum simulator that can operate with 256 qubits.
- 8 July – Scientists report that in the past – with little relevance to future evolution – lower temperatures were associated with larger Homo body sizes and that long-term variability in precipitation was correlated with brain size.

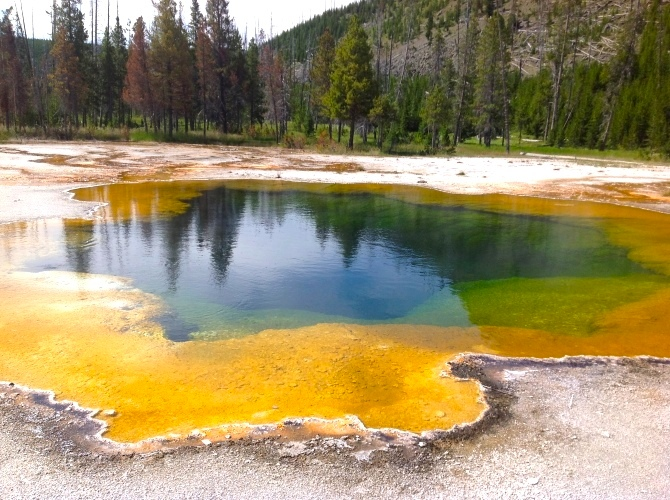
10 July: Scientists report the discovery of long extrachromosomal DNA structures, they call "borgs", which appear to incorporate genes from organisms they encounter in or near archaea in mud.

- 10 July – Scientists report in a preprint the discovery of long extrachromosomal DNA structures, they call borgs, which appear to incorporate genes from organisms they encounter. These structures, which could turn out to be an unknown form of giant viruses or "giant linear plasmids", co-occur with a species of archaeon which may host them, shares many of their genes, whose main chromosome is only three times larger and whose capacity for anaerobic oxidation of methane as well as other biological functions – such as production of proteins – the borgs may augment.
- 12 July – Scientists report in a preprint that the viral load in the first positive test of infections with the SARS-CoV-2 Delta variant was on average ~1000 times higher than with compared infections during 2020.
- 14 July
  - Researchers report finding the earliest known fossil life on Earth, in the form of "putative filamentous microfossils", possibly of methanogens and/or methanotrophs, that lived about 3.42-billion-year-old in "a paleo-subseafloor hydrothermal vein system of the Barberton greenstone belt in South Africa."
  - Astronomers report the detection, for the first time, of an isotope in the atmosphere of an exoplanet. In specific, the isotope Carbon-13 (^{13}C) was found in the atmosphere of a gas giant exoplanet named TYC 8998-760-1 b.
  - Researchers used a brain-computer interface to enable a man who was paralyzed since 2003 to produce comprehensible words and sentences by decoding signals from electrodes in the speech areas of his brain.
  - Researchers describe effects of deforestation and climate change in a transformation of Amazonia from carbon sink to carbon source.
- 15 July – Scientists report that the Chicxulub impactor likely was an outer main-belt asteroid, a carbonaceous chondrite C-type asteroid.
- 16 July
  - Recently thought subglacial lakes under the Southern Polar cap of Mars based on a 2018 MARSIS measurement could also be clay minerals and frozen brine.
  - Japan achieves a new world record Internet speed over ~3.000 km: 319 Tbit/s, beating a previous record of 178 Tbit/s.
  - A study concludes only 1.5-7 % of "regions" of the modern human genome to be specific to modern humans. These regions have neither been altered by archaic hominin DNA due to admixture nor are shared with Neanderthals or Denisovans according to their used genomic datasets. They also found two bursts of changes specific to modern human genomes which involve genes related to brain development and function.
  - A study using whole-genome resequencing indicates that Cannabis sativa was first domesticated about 12,000 years ago in the early Neolithic period in East Asia, with the results being consistent with a single domestication origin.
- 18 July – Journalists and researchers report the discovery of spyware, called "Pegasus", developed and distributed by a private company which can and has widely been used to infect iOS and Android smartphones often – partly based on 0-day exploits – without the need for any user-interaction or significant clues to the user and then be used to exfiltrate data, track user locations, capture film through its camera, and activate the microphone at any time.

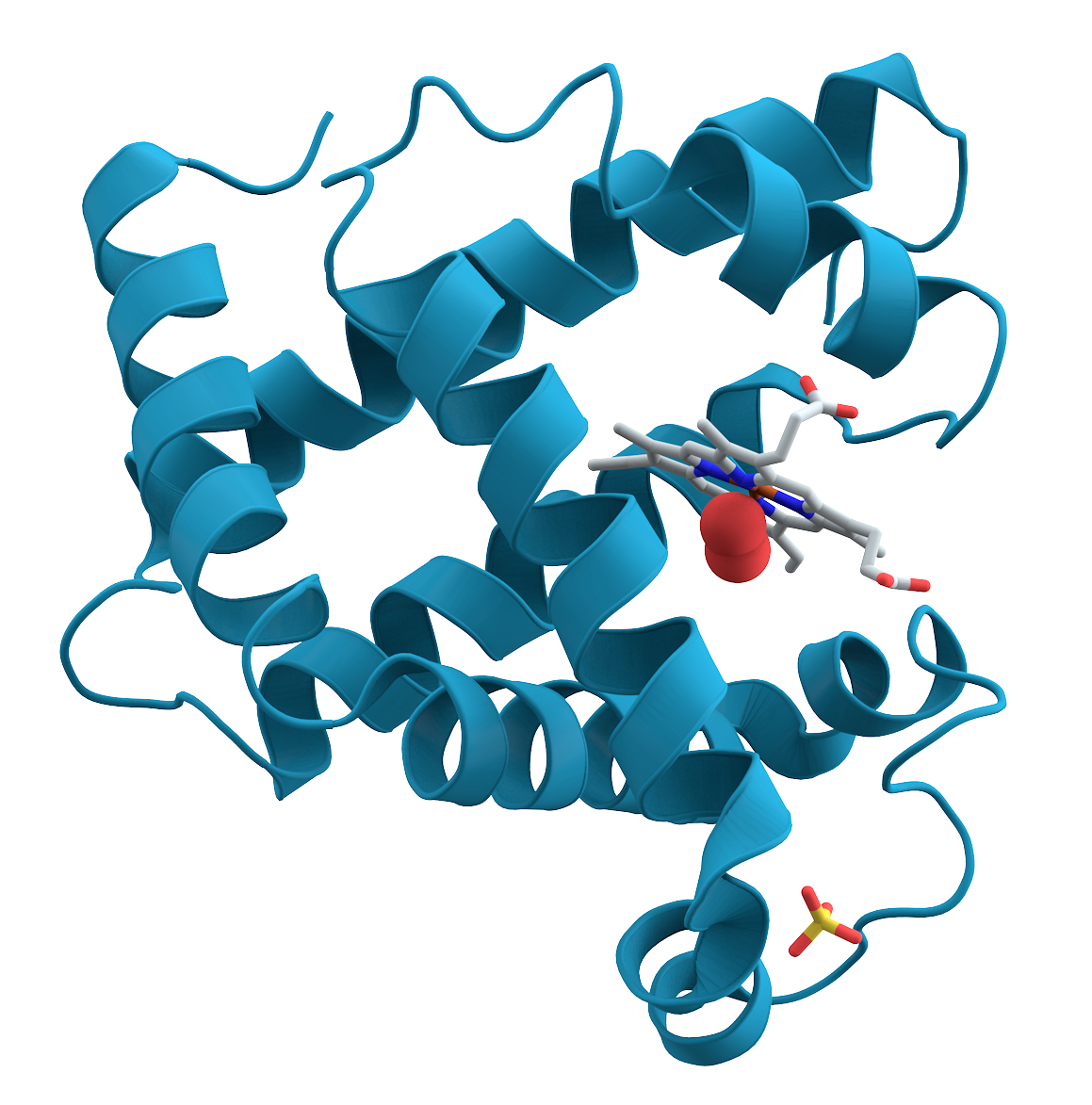
22 July: DeepMind's AlphaFold AI predicts the 3D structures of ~350,000 proteins.

- 19 July
  - Researchers review 217 analyses of on-the-market products and services as well as existing alternatives to mainstream food, holidays, and furnishings, and conclude that total greenhouse gas emissions by Swedes could be lowered by to date up to 36–38 % if consumers – without a decrease in total estimated expenditure or considerations of self-interest rationale – instead were to obtain those they could assess to be more sustainable.
  - Researchers report that higher exposure to woodland urban green spaces is associated with improved cognitive development and risks of mental problems for urban 15-16 years old adolescents.
  - Scientists report that wild pigs are causing soil disturbance that, among other problems, globally results in annual carbon dioxide emissions equivalent to that of ~1.1 million passenger vehicles, implying that wild pig meat – unlike other meat products – has beneficial effects on the environment.

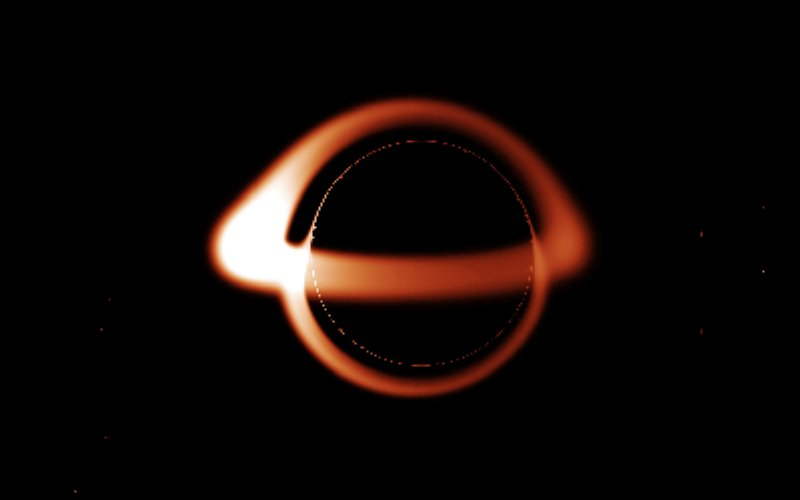
28 July: The first direct observation of light from behind a black hole.

- 20 July
  - Researchers conclude that a previously rejected abiotic origin of phosphine concentrations on Venus reported in September 2020 – high rates of active plume volcanism – could be plausible.
  - A scientific review concludes that, except for poultry, at 50 g/day unprocessed red (~9 % increase) and processed meat (~18 %) appear to be risk factors for ischemic heart disease.
  - Scientists report that worldwide adolescent loneliness and depression increased substantially after 2012 and that loneliness in contemporary schools appears to be associated with smartphone access and Internet use.

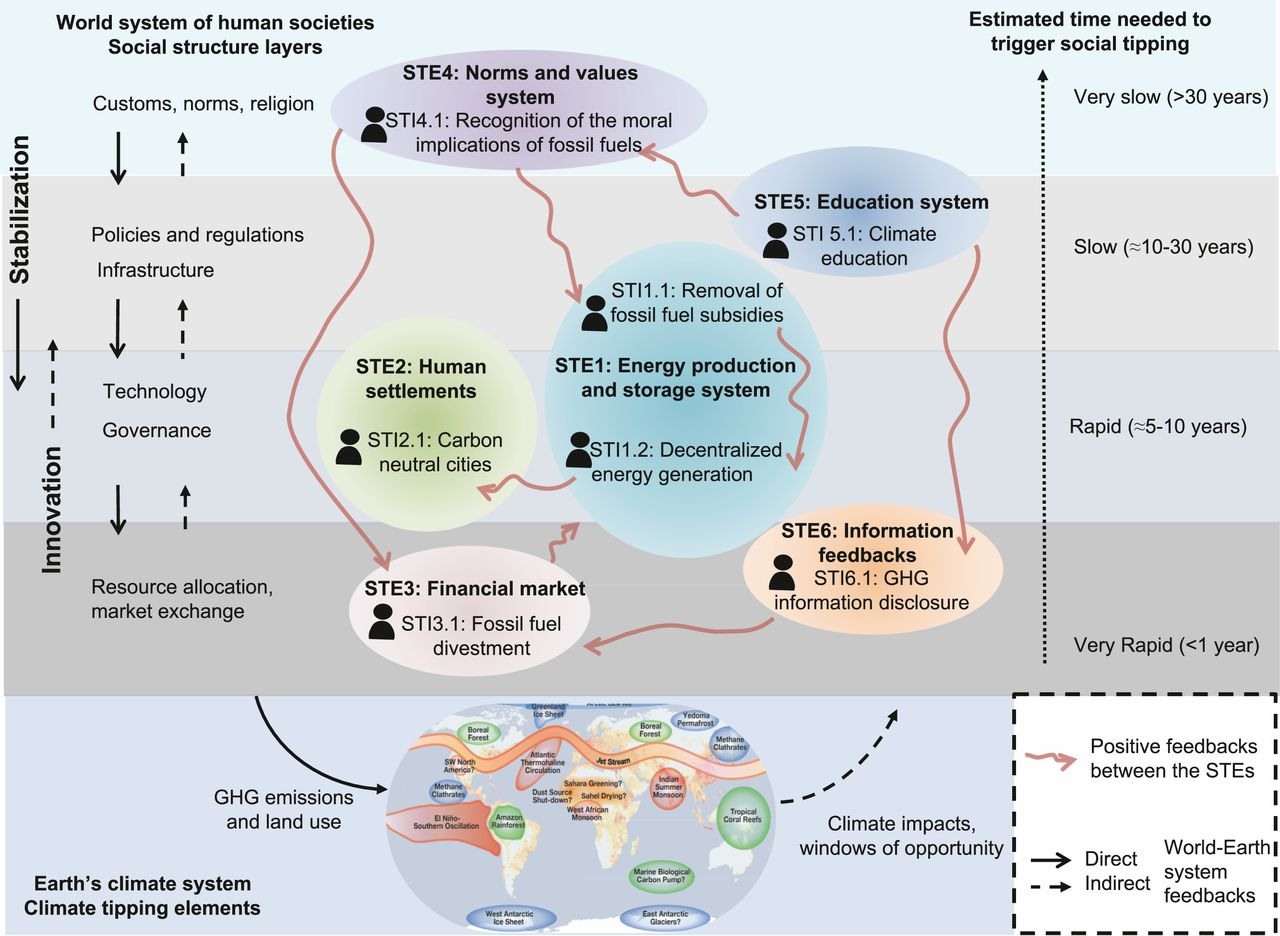
28 July: Scientists publish an update to the World Scientists' Warning to Humanity.

- 22 July
  - Astronomers using the Atacama Large Millimetre/submillimeter Array (ALMA) report the first clear detection of a moon-forming disc around an exoplanet; in this case, the Jupiter-like planet PDS 70c.
  - DeepMind announces that its AlphaFold AI has predicted the structures of over 350,000 proteins, including 98.5% of the ~20,000 proteins in the human body. The 3D data along with their degrees of confidence for accuracy is made freely available with a new database, doubling the previous number of protein structures in the public domain.
- 26 July
  - The Galileo Project, headed by Avi Loeb, is launched. The project seeks to gather and report scientific evidence of extraterrestrials or extraterrestrial technology – such as of UFOs/UAP with alien origins – on or near Earth via telescope technology.
  - Scientists report to have created the first complete neuron-level-resolution 3D map of a monkey brain which they scanned within 100 hours.
  - A study finds that the increasing probability of record week-long heat extremes occurrence depends on warming rate, rather than global warming level and provides projections.
  - A scientific review summarizes studies about long COVID.
- 28 July
  - The first direct observation of light from behind a black hole is reported, further confirming Einstein's theory of general relativity.
  - Metallic water is prepared for the first time in an ordinary Earth lab.
  - In an update to the World Scientists' Warning to Humanity, scientists report that evidence of nearing or crossed tipping points of critical elements of the Earth system is accumulating, that 18 of 31 planetary vital signs have reached record values, that 1990 jurisdictions have formally recognized a state of climate emergency, that frequent and accessible updates on the emergency are needed, that COVID-19 "green recovery" has been insufficient and that root-cause system changes above politics are required.
- 29 July – A study indicates gut microbiomes with large amounts of microbes capable of generating unique secondary bile acids are a key element of centenarians' longevity.
- 31 July – A kitchen robot – one of the first of its kind – for autonomous preparation of school meal program or delivery-service level amounts of discrete meals is demonstrated.

=== August ===
9 August: The IPCC begins releasing its latest major report on climate change.

- 2 August – Engineers report the development of a prototype wave energy converter that is twice as efficient as similar existing experimental technologies, which could be a major step towards practical viability of tapping into the sustainable energy source.
- 4 August
  - Scientists identify genetic determinants of ovarian ageing and possible effects of extending fertility in women.
  - Scientists describe the molecular mechanisms by which insect olfactory systems are sensitive enough to recognize and discriminate a vast number of molecules with very few smell receptors.
- 5 August
  - New observations of the M-type star L 98-59 and its surrounding system reveal three new bodies: a planet in the habitable zone, an ocean world, and a planet with half the mass of Venus, making it the lightest exoplanet ever to be measured using the radial velocity method.
  - A study introduces an early-warning indicator for critical transitions of the Atlantic Meridional Overturning Circulation (AMOC) and finds early-warning signals in eight independent AMOC indices. A, possibly abrupt, likely irreversible collapse from the current strong to a weak mode is thought to have severe impacts on Earth system components and global climate. The Sixth IPCC report assesses a 'medium confidence' that such a collapse won't happen by 2100.
- 8 August – The National Ignition Facility achieves a 70% yield, compared to the laser energy required to sustain fusion, from inertial confinement fusion energy, an 8X improvement over previous experiments in spring 2021 and a 25X increase over the yields achieved in 2018.
- 9 August
  - The Intergovernmental Panel on Climate Change (IPCC) releases the first part of its Sixth Assessment Report, which summarizes the state of physical science on climate change based on over 14,000 papers and concludes that effects of human-caused climate change are now "widespread, rapid, and intensifying".
  - Neuroscientists show that transplantation of fecal microbiota from young donor mice into aged recipient mice substantially rejuvenates the brains of the latter, complementing similar results of a 2020 study.
  - A scientific review assesses the long-term effects of COVID-19, including in prevalent cases of long COVID.
  - A researcher reports that solar superstorms would cause global months-long Internet outages. She describes potential mitigation measures and exceptions – such as user-powered mesh networks, related peer-to-peer applications and new protocols – and the robustness of the current Internet infrastructure.
- 10 August
  - A study based on OSIRIS-REx data concludes there to be a 1:1750 chance of an impact of asteroid (101955) Bennu by 2300, with the highest chance of impact being in 2182.
  - A small-scale study suggests that persistent blood clotting is a cause of long COVID.
- 11 August – Researchers report promising results of ongoing testing and development of an engineered monoclonal antibodies based female contraception.
- 12 August – Scientists report that the Ayta Magbukun people in the Philippines have the highest level of Denisovan ancestry in the world and describe the related genetic history in the region.
- 13 August – Researchers demonstrate that probiotics can help coral reefs mitigate heat stress, indicating that such could make them more resilient to climate change and mitigate coral bleaching.
- 16 August
  - Scientists conclude that personal carbon allowances could be a component of climate change mitigation. They find that the economic recovery from COVID-19 and novel digital technology capacities open a window of opportunity for first implementations of such monetary/credit feedback and decreasing default levels of emissions concessions.
  - Researchers assess regionally-differentiated drivers and risks associated with worldwide pollinator decline, informing globally-relevant policy responses.
- 17 August – Scientists report of human brain organoids that could intrinsically develop eye-type sensory structures.
- 18 August – A study suggests that the global policy Montreal Protocol intended to control the production of ozone-depleting substances has also substantially mitigated climate change.
- 20 August – Medical scientists confirm that hormone irisin confers neurobiological effects of physical exercise and, when its circulating levels are increased, can be an exercise mimetic in mice which may be useful for interventions to improve cognitive function or alleviate Alzheimer's disease.
- 22 August – Astronomers conclude in a preprint that – controversially due to there being only few data points – there is high confidence "Planet 9" exists, that it likely has a mass of ~6.2 Earths and is closer than thought previously and report its likely orbit.

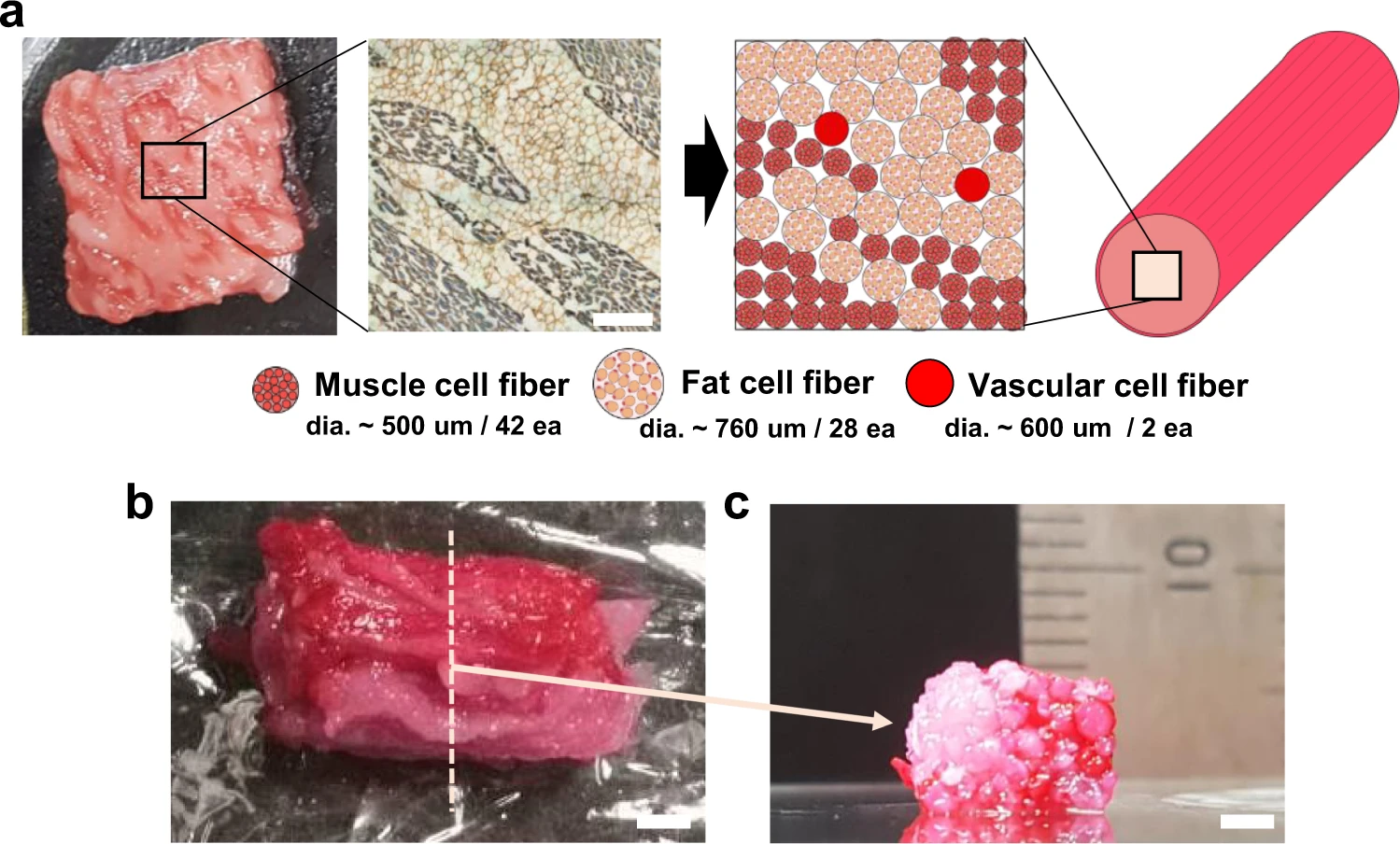
Researchers present a bioprinting method to produce steak-like cultured meat.

- 24 August
  - Cerebras announces a new hardware and software platform that can support AI models of 120 trillion parameters, enabling neural networks greater than the equivalent number of human brain synapses.
  - Researchers present a bioprinting method to produce steak-like cultured meat, composed of three types of bovine cell fibers.
- 26 August – Astronomers report a new class of habitable exoplanets, named hycean planets (from hydrogen and ocean), which are described as hot, water-covered planets with a hydrogen-rich atmosphere that are possibly capable of harboring life.
- 27 August – Scientists report about vaccine effectiveness, pandemic severity impacts and regional prevalence of SARS-CoV-2 Delta variant overall and its newly subdivided subvariants named from AY.1 onwards, the first two of which were differentiated like so – also termed "Delta Plus" – in June. On 10 August a preprint reports a case of asymptomatic transmissions associated with high viral load among vaccinated patients infected by AY.3.
- 28 August – The world's northernmost island, a small patch of land measuring 60 x 30 metres, is reported by scientists off the coast of Greenland. The name Qeqertaq Avannarleq is proposed, which means "the northernmost island" in Greenlandic.
- 30 August
  - The comprehensive 2021 ESC Guidelines on cardiovascular disease prevention is published. On 27 August the 2021 ESC Guidelines for the diagnosis and treatment of acute and chronic heart failure is published.
  - A preprint study of nationwide data of Israel's vaccination programme finds a strong effect of waning immunity from the Pfizer-BioNTech COVID-19 vaccine after 6 months.
- 31 August – Scientists report that the Paleocene–Eocene Thermal Maximum ~56 million years ago was directly preceded by volcanism and that data about the event supports the existence of substantial climate-shifting tipping points in the Earth system.

=== September ===
- 1 September
  - NASA reports the successful sampling of a rock on Mars, named "Rochette", after a less successful first attempt.
  - Scientists report the development of a new solar-energy passive off-grid chemically stored on-demand cooling system for houses and/or refrigeration without electrical components which may be useful for climate change mitigation and adaptation.

2 September: The WHO adjusts its air quality guidelines after studies found that i.a. air pollution is associated with substantially increased mortality even below current WHO guideline values.

- 2 September
  - Observation of a new class of supernova triggered by a black hole or neutron star crashing into the core of a companion star is reported by astronomers, based on studies of an extremely luminous source of radio waves called VT 1210+4956.
  - Astronomers report the detection of peculiar radio waves from near the galactic center whose unidentified source could represent a new class of astronomical objects.
  - A study finds that outdoor air pollution is associated with substantially increased mortality "even at low pollution levels below the current European and North American standards and WHO guideline values". On 22 September, for the first time since 2005, the World Health Organization (WHO), after a systematic review of the accumulated evidence, adjusted their air quality guidelines whose adherence could save millions of lives, protect against future diseases and help meet climate goals.
- 3 September
  - Bioengineers report the development of a viable CRISPR-Cas gene-editing system, "CasMINI", that is about twice as compact as the commonly used Cas9 and Cas12a.
  - Researchers report that autoantibodies against one's own ACE2 enzymes (the major entry point receptors for COVID-19), autoimmune disease, may be a (main) cause of long COVID. Earlier studies suggested this may explain unusual pattern of organ damage by COVID-19.
  - Scientists report that the accelerated, higher-variability warming of the Arctic can cause (more frequent) extremely cold winter weather across parts of Asia and North America – including the February 2021 North American cold wave – via a, observed and modeled, stratospheric polar vortex disruption.
- 6 September – Experts report that one-third of all chondrichthyes fish species are threatened with extinction, mainly caused by overfishing.
- 8 September
  - Cysteamine, an antioxidant drug already approved for human use, is shown to reverse atherosclerosis, the process responsible for heart attacks and strokes, in mice.
  - Scientists provide the first scientific assessment of the minimum amount of fossil fuels that would need to be secured from extraction per region as well as globally, to allow for a 50% probability of limiting global warming by 2050 to 1.5 °C.
  - Scientists report that Earth is reflecting less light – a dimming of ~0.5% in reflectance over two decades may have both been co-caused by climate change as well as substantially increase global warming.
- 10 September
  - Scientists report what could be the discovery of the oldest rock art, likely dating back to ~169–226,000 years ago, much older than what was previously thought to be the earliest known drawing, made ~73,000 years ago. Children likely intentionally placed a series of hands and feet in mud. The findings could also be the earliest evidence of Hominins on the above 4000 m a.s.l. high Tibetan Plateau.
  - 43 expert scientists publish the first scientific framework version that – via integration, review, clarifications and standardization – enables the evaluation of levels of protection of marine protected areas and can serve as a guide for improving, planning and monitoring marine protection-quality and -extents such as in efforts towards the 30%-protection-goal of the "Global Deal For Nature" and the UN's SDG 14.
  - The CDC reports that despite prevalence of the Delta variant people vaccinated against COVID-19 are ~11 times less likely to die from COVID-19 (age-standardized rates of 1.6 versus 0.1 and 1.1 versus 0.1 weekly deaths per 100,000 U.S. citizens), showing vaccines' effectiveness at preventing severe disease.

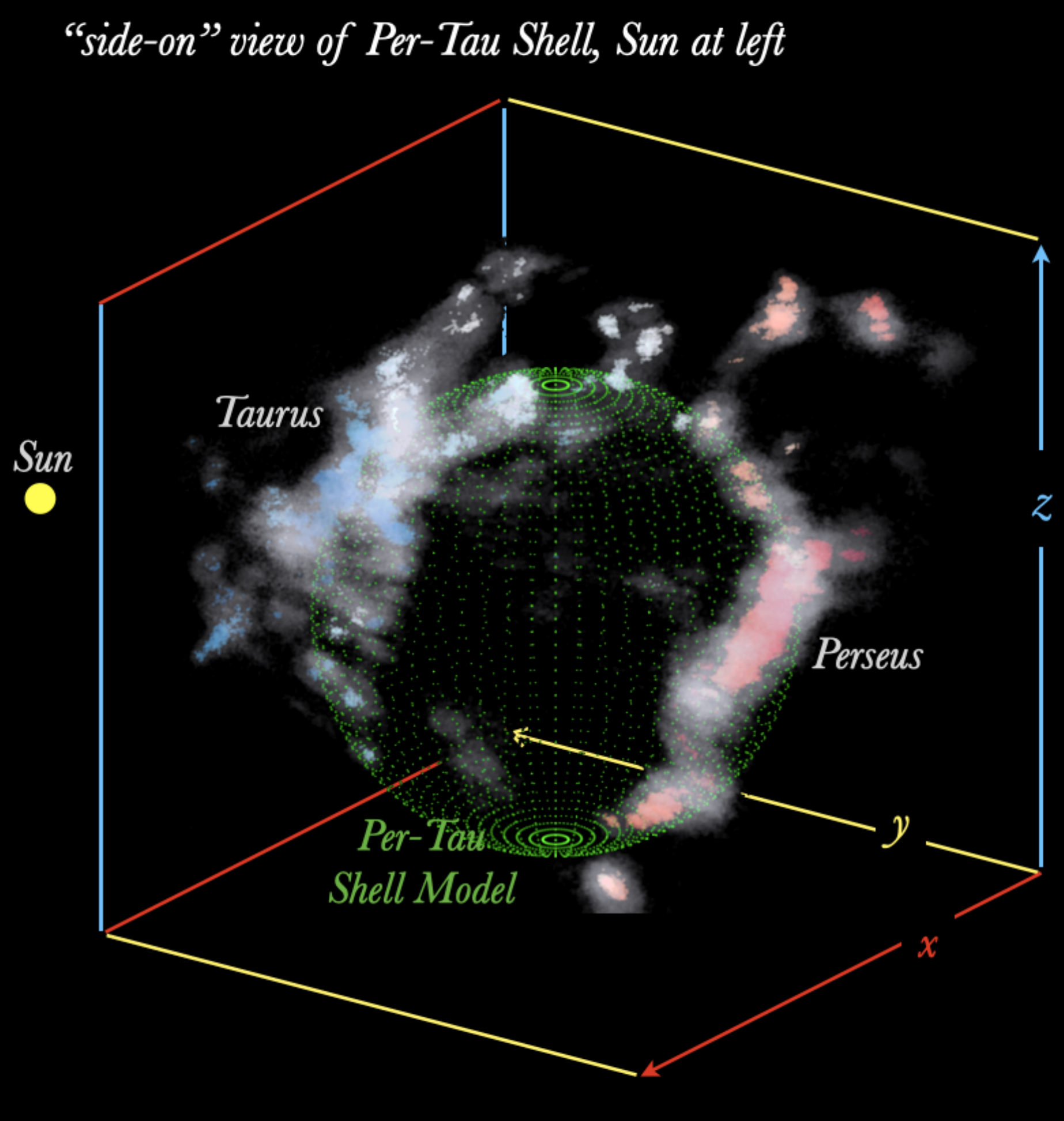
22 September: Astronomers report the discovery of the Per-Tau Shell, a giant star-forming spherical shell.

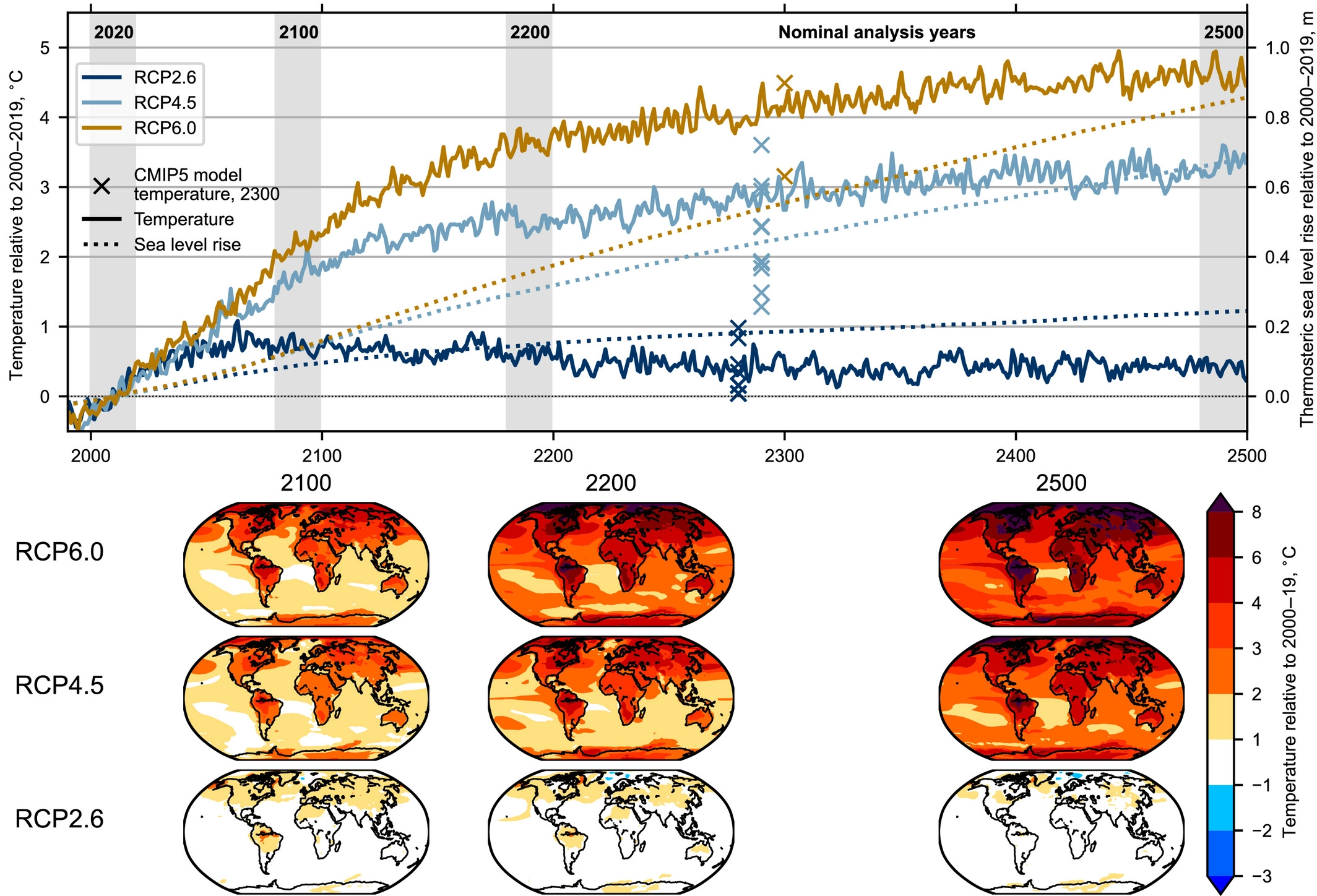
24 September: Projecting effects of greenhouse gas emissions only for up to 2100 is found to be short-sighted. New models for climate change scenarios for up to 2500 are published.

- 13 September – A scientific review concludes that accumulating data suggests dietary restriction (DR) – mainly intermittent fasting and caloric restriction – results in many of the same beneficial changes in adult humans as in studied organisms, potentially increasing health- and lifespan. A review published on 22 September provides an overview of DR as an intervention and develops a framework for a proposed field of "precision nutrigeroscience". A study published on 29 September identifies circadian-regulated autophagy as a critical contributor to intermittent time-restricted fasting-mediated lifespan extension in Drosophila and suggests that only certain forms of and/or combinations with intermittent fasting – intervals during which no food but only e.g. water and tea/coffee are ingested – may be effective beyond the benefits of healthy body weight.
- 15 September
  - Physicists report candidate dark energy particles, Sun-produced local environment-adjusted "chameleon particles", at the dark matter detector XENON1T experiment.
  - Scientists confirm that widespread phytoplankton blooms can be a feedback effect of wildfires. The climate change-exacerbated 2019–2020 Australian wildfires caused oceanic deposition of wildfire aerosols, enhancing marine productivity and thereby increased oceanic carbon dioxide uptake. A study using satellite data complements these findings, constraining the amount of CO_{2} emissions of the fires from November 2019 to January 2020 to around 715 million tons.
  - Media outlets report that the world's first cultured coffee products have been created by two biotechnology companies, still awaiting regulatory approval for near-term commercialization. Such products, for which multiple companies' R&D have acquired substantial funding, may have equal or highly similar effects, composition and taste as natural products but use less water, generate less carbon emissions, require less labor and cause no deforestation.
- 16 September – Scientists report evidence of clothes being made 120,000 years ago based on findings in deposits in Morocco, a country in the northwestern part of Africa.
- 17 September
  - Scientists report that harmful algal blooms, which have been linked to deforestation, global warming and soil erosion, are proliferating in lakes and rivers around the globe. They add that such toxic algal blooms were a prominent feature of previous mass extinction events, in particular of the End-Permian Extinction.
  - Researchers report in a preprint the discovery of i.a. the so far closest known relative virus, with a 96.8% similarity, to SARS-CoV-2 in samples from wild horseshoe bats in northern Laos – 0.7% more similar than the virus RaTG13 discovered in China in 2013. Their findings indicate that, as of 2021, SARS-CoV-2-like viruses potentially infectious for humans circulate in bats in the Indochinese peninsula and that the pandemic virus may not originate from Wuhan. Other scientists complement these findings, reporting in a preprint published on 20 September, that they could not find any SARS-CoV-2 related viruses in any samples collected in China, including from the only two domestic caves where RaTG13 and RmYN02 were detected, indicating such viruses may currently not circulate in bats in the country.
- 22 September – Astronomers report the discovery of a nearby spherical structure, a 'superbubble', on the edges of which giant molecular clouds (Perseus and Taurus) with regions of star formation are being formed, the Per-Tau Shell.
- 23 September
  - Scientists report the discovery of human footprints in the state of New Mexico that are understood to be ~23,000 years old, around the time of the last Ice Age.
  - Researchers report the world's first artificial synthesis of starch. The material essential for many products and the most common carbohydrate in human diets was made from CO_{2} in a cell-free process and could reduce land, pesticide and water use as well as greenhouse gas emissions while increasing food security.
  - After commissioning two impact assessment studies and a technology analysis study, the European Commission proposes the implementation of a standardization – for versions of USB-C – of phone charger products, which may increase device-interoperability, convergence and convenience for consumers while decreasing resource-needs, redundancy and electronic waste.

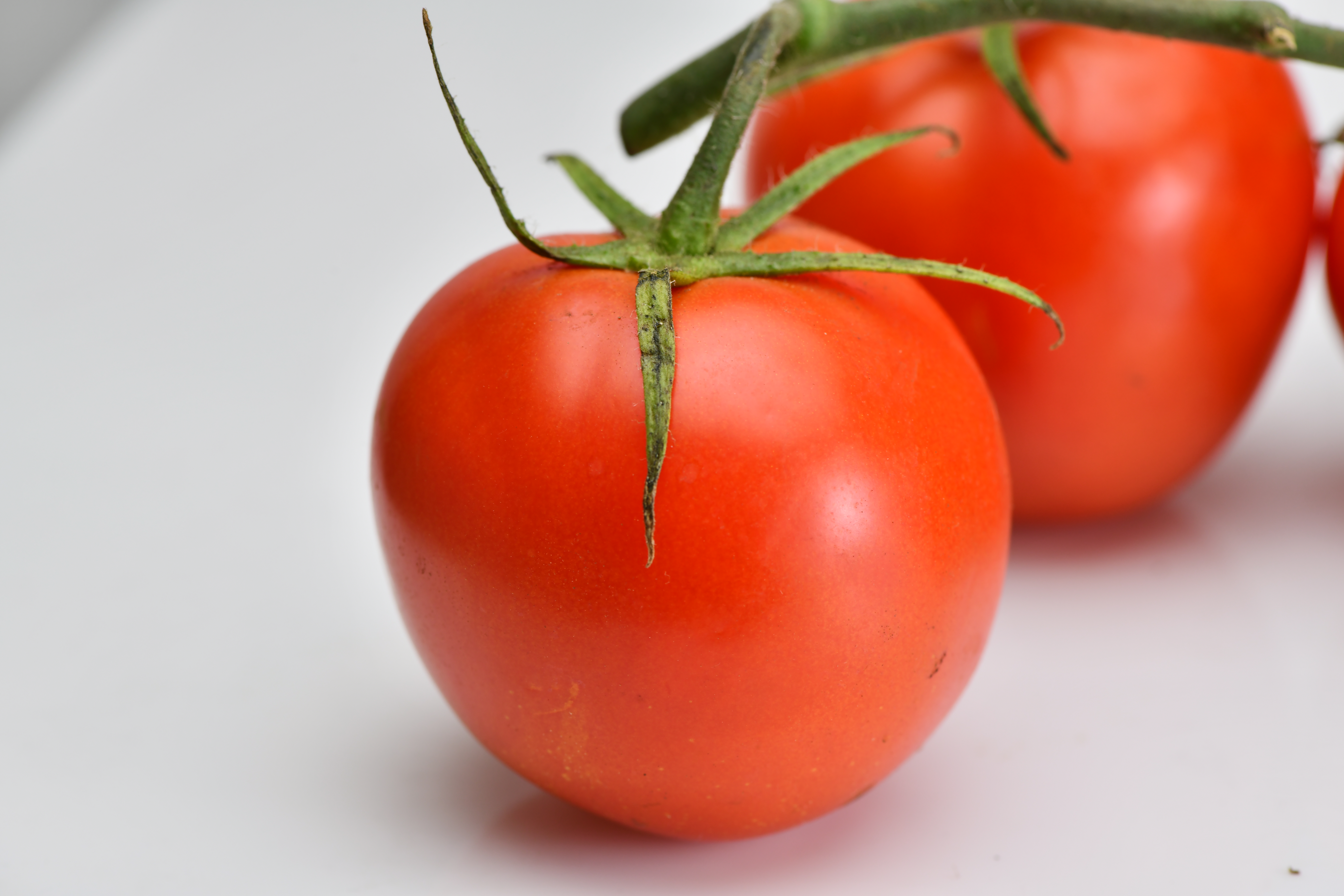
24 September: The first CRISPR-edited food, tomatoes, goes on public sale.

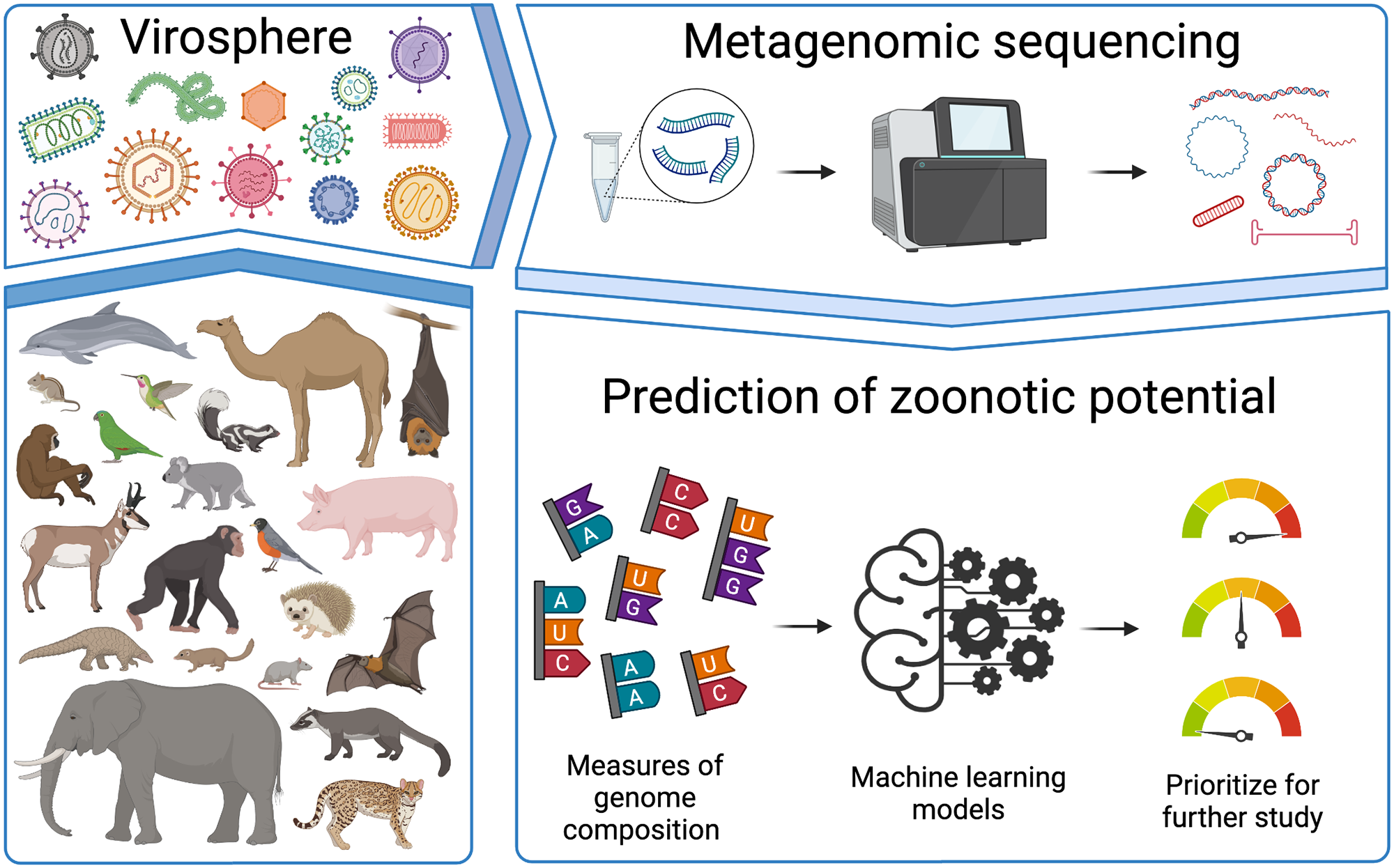
28 September: Researchers develop machine learning models for genome-based early detection and prioritization of high-risk potential zoonotic viruses.

- 24 September
  - Researchers conclude that projecting effects – such as regional inhabitability, human migration and food insecurity – of greenhouse gas emissions only for up to 2100, as widely practiced in research and policy-making, is short-sighted and model climate change scenarios for up to 2500.
  - Media outlets report that in Japan the first CRISPR-edited food has gone on public sale. Tomatoes were genetically modified for around five times the normal amount of possibly calming GABA. CRISPR was first applied in tomatoes in 2014.
  - Biomedical researchers demonstrate a switchable Yamanaka factors-reprogramming-based approach for regeneration of damaged heart without tumor-formation in mice.
- 26 September – Researchers estimate that children born in 2020 (e.g. "Generation Alpha") will experience 2–7 times as many extreme weather events, particularly heat waves, compared to people born in 1960 (e.g. "Baby Boomers" and "Generation X") under current climate policy pledges over their lifetimes, raising issues of intergenerational equity.
- 27 September
  - Landsat 9, described as the world's most important satellite, is launched by NASA to study the Earth and its environment.
  - Biochemists and space scientists report that sunlight-, acidity- and water activity-levels in Venus' clouds may have the potential to support Earth-like phototrophy such as photosynthesis.
- 28 September
  - Medical scientists report that COVID-19 measures may have, apparently, caused the global extinction of the influenza B virus lineage B/Yamagata.
  - Pathogen researchers report the development of machine learning models for genome-based early detection and prioritization of high-risk potential zoonotic viruses in animals prior to spillover to humans. They conclude that their tool could be used for virus surveillance for pandemic prevention via (i.a.) measures of "early investigation and outbreak preparedness" and would have been capable of predicting SARS-CoV-2 as a high-risk strain.

=== October ===
- 1 October – A company conducting a preliminary small (~380 patients × 2) clinical trial launched a year ago reports that molnupiravir substantially reduced the risk of hospitalization (7.3% to 14.1%) and death (8 to 0) from COVID-19.
- 4 October
  - The 2021 Nobel Prize in Medicine is awarded to David Julius and Ardem Patapoutian for their findings about how heat, cold and touch can initiate signals in the nervous system.
  - Metascientists report, based on a citation analysis, that "structures fostering disruptive scholarship and focusing attention on novel ideas" could be important as in a growing scientific field citation flows disproportionately consolidate to citing already well-cited papers, possibly slowing and inhibiting canonical progress.
- 5 October
  - The 2021 Nobel Prize in Physics is awarded to Syukuro Manabe, Klaus Hasselmann and Giorgio Parisi for their work on climate change, resulting from the role of humanity.
- 6 October
  - The 2021 Nobel Prize in Chemistry is awarded to Benjamin List and David W.C. MacMillan for their work in creating a tool to build molecules, that may be useful for studies on developing new drugs and reducing the effect of chemicals on the environment.
  - The WHO endorses the first malaria vaccine.
  - A study of data traffic by popular smartphones running variants of the Android software finds substantial by-default data collection and sharing with no opt-out and implications for users' privacy, control and security.
  - With 17 studies a consortium of MICrONS researchers concludes the first phase of a long-term project (BICCN) to generate an atlas of the entire mouse (mammalian) brain, releasing an atlas and census of cell types in the primary motor cortex.
- 7 October – Scientists show experimentally, with brain organoids grown from stem cells, how differences between humans and chimpanzees are also substantially caused by the 98% of DNA outside the protein-coding genes, often discarded as "junk DNA" – in particular via CRE-regulated expression of the ZNF558 gene for a transcription factor.
- 8 October – A new eco-friendly way of extracting and separating rare earth elements is described, using a bacteria-derived protein called lanmodulin, which binds easily to the metals.

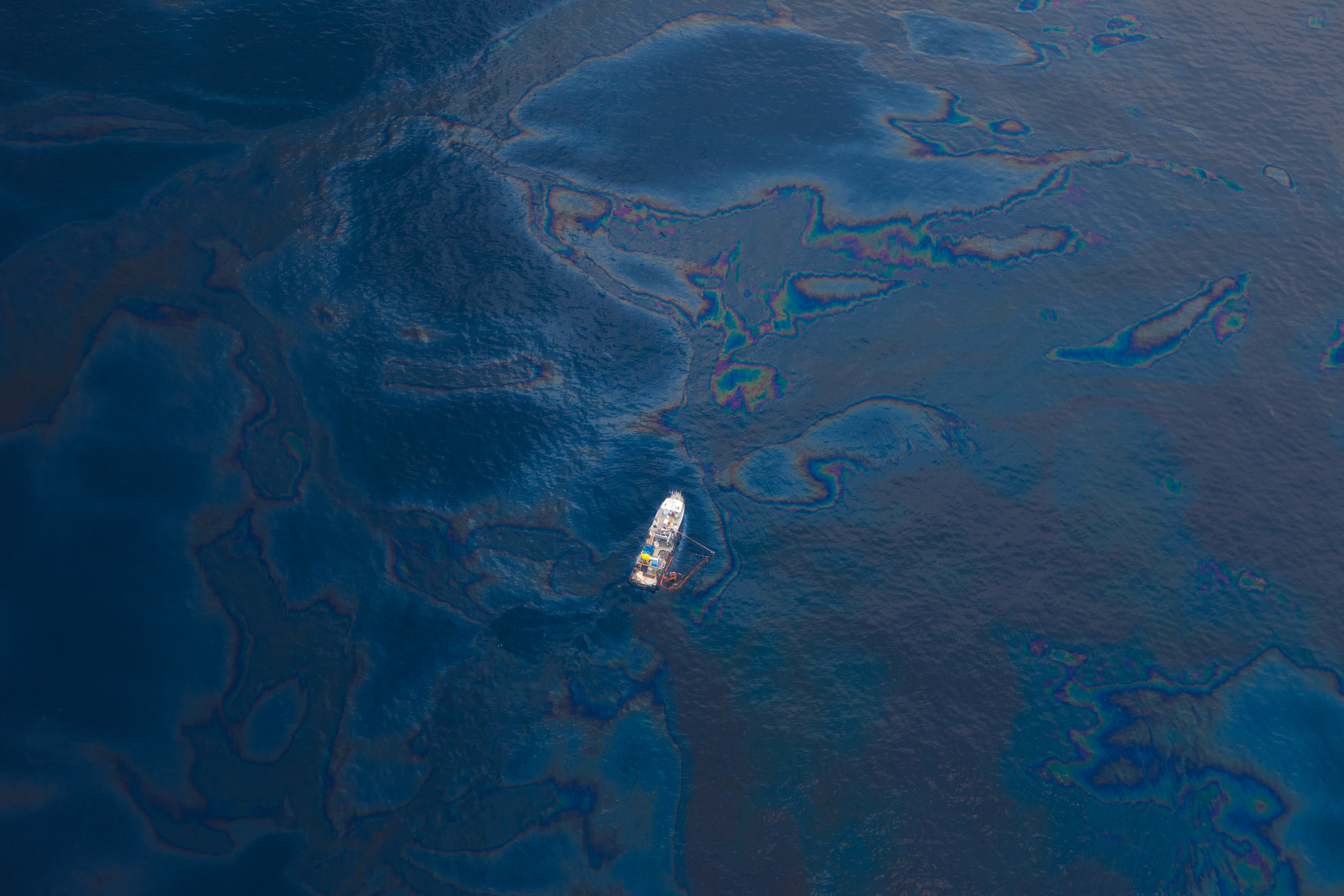
11 October: Scientists project public health impacts of an imminent Red Sea oil spill from the FSO Safer.

- 11 October
  - Scientists report more precise dating of what appear to be the earliest bipedal footprints with hominin-like characteristics, the Trachilos footprints. They are found to be ~6.05 million years old, which is around the time of Orrorin – the previously earliest theorized species of Homininae until these footprints were controversially dated in 2017, despite being discovered outside of Africa in Crete, Greece. However, these apes are not necessarily associated with human evolution.
  - The pilot project of the "world's first automated, driverless train" is launched in the city of Hamburg, Germany. The conventional, standard-track, non-metro train technology could theoretically be implemented for rail transport worldwide and is reported to also be substantially more energy efficient.
  - Scientists project public health impacts, along with some of the environmental damage, of a, simulated, imminent Red Sea oil spill from the FSO Safer.
- 12 October – Scientists report that for 13,115 cities extreme heat exposure of a wet bulb globe temperature above 30 °C tripled between 1983 and 2016. It increased by ~50% when the population growth in these cities is not taken into account. Urban areas are often significantly warmer than surrounding rural areas.
- 13 October – Astronomers report the detection of hundreds of Fast Radio Bursts (FRBs) from a single system.
- 15 October – The first brain metabolome atlas of the mouse brain – and of an animal (a mammal) across different life stages – is released.
- 16 October
  - The spacecraft Lucy is launched by NASA, the first mission to explore the Trojan asteroids.
  - A comprehensive study by Scientists for Future concludes that nuclear fission energy cannot meaningfully contribute to climate change mitigation as it is "too dangerous, too expensive, and too sluggishly deployable" as well as "an obstacle to achieving the social-ecological transformation".
- 18 October – A study shows for the first time how immunity is inherited, via epigenetic changes, in mice (mammals).
- 19 October – Media outlets report about novel technologies for virtual try-ons of clothes for more sustainable fashion and improved online shopping, which increased relatively due to the COVID-19 pandemic.

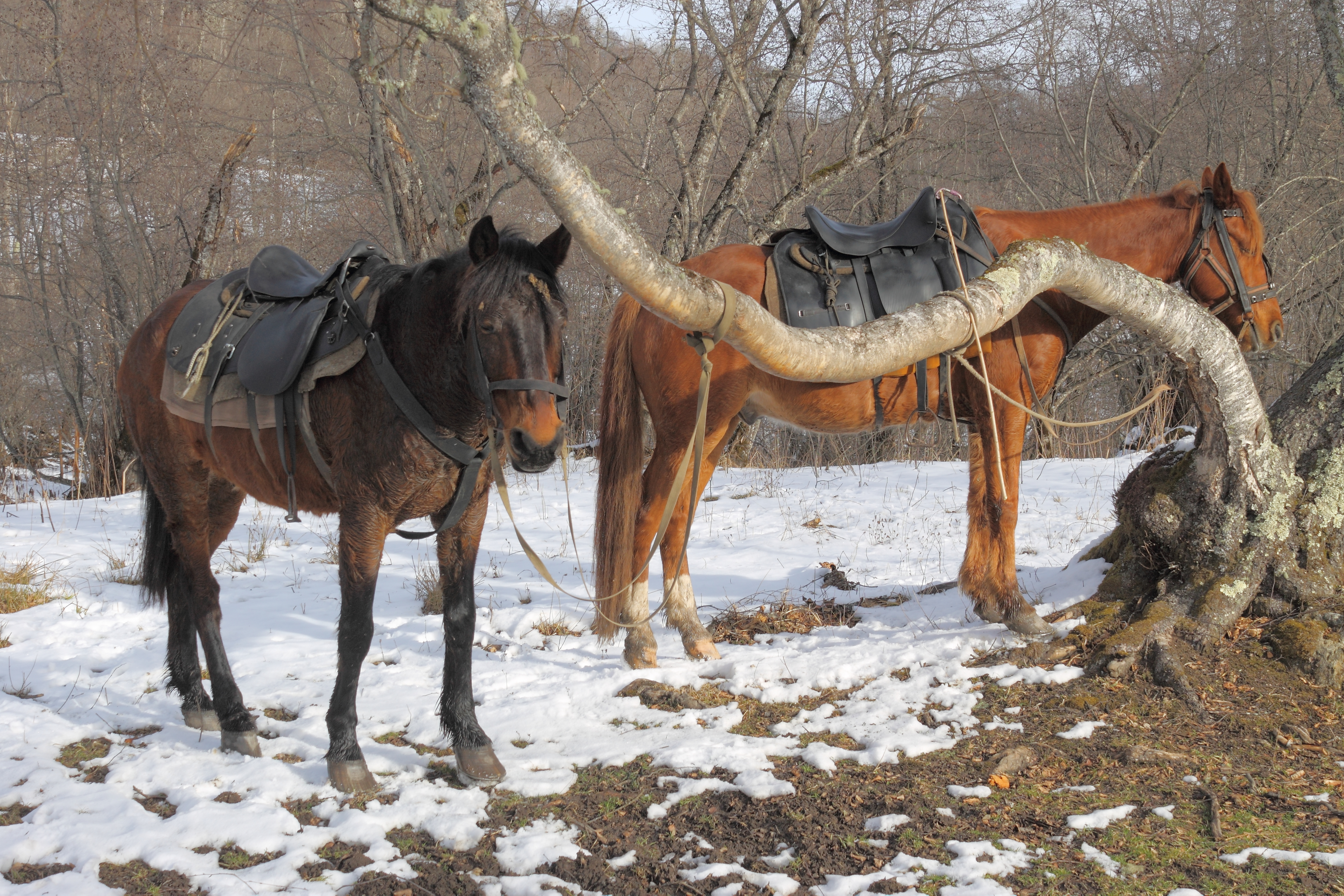
20 October: Scientists report that, according to their genetic analysis, today's domestic horses descend from the lower Volga-Don region, Russia.

- 20 October
  - Astronomers report the first evidence of a giant impact between two exoplanets, which occurred in the HD 172555 system, based on analysis of gas and dust concentrations.
  - Scientists report that, according to their analysis, today's domestic horses descend from the lower Volga-Don region, Russia. 273 ancient horse genomes further indicate that these populations replaced almost all local populations as they expanded rapidly throughout Eurasia from about 4200 years ago, that certain adaptations were strongly selected for by horse riding, and that equestrian material culture – including Sintashta spoke-wheeled chariots and in the case of Asia Indo-Iranian languages – spread alongside.
  - Researchers report on the first natural protein that, using lanmodulin, complexes actinium, a natural but radioactive element used in cancer therapy, alongside yttrium-90.
- 21 October
  - Medical researchers announce that on 25 September the first successful xenotransplantation of a genetically engineered pig kidney, along with the pig thymus gland to make the immune system recognize it as part of the body, to a brain-dead human with no immediate signs of rejection, moving the practice closer to clinical trials with living humans.
  - A study shows how COVID-19 may inflict long-term brain damage, including in cases of 'long COVID', via endothelial cell-death disrupting the blood–brain barrier.
- 22 October
  - Researchers describe and substantiate the hypothesis that a recent decrease in brain size "in the last 3,000 years" (previously thought to instead have occurred during the last ~28,000 years) has resulted from externalization of knowledge and group decision-making, partly via social systems of distributed cognition and sharing of information. A study by Villmoare et al. (2022) that reanalyzes the used data refutes their findings. It concludes that "the samples need to be specific enough to test the hypothesis across different times and populations".
  - A study shows that mandatory face masks and social distancing can allow for relatively safe public transport during the COVID-19 pandemic, reducing infection rates by 93.5% and 98.1% in tracking-based simulations of common contemporary forms of public transport during congestion peak-hour.
- 25 October
  - Astronomers report, with two studies, that 'BLC1' does not appear to be a technosignature or extraterrestrial radio transmission because 15 similar observations were made between 2019 and 2020 that did not originate from around Proxima Centauri – and hence are likely results of forms of local radiofrequency interference – and propose a sequence of "verification checks for narrowband technosignature signals".
  - Another, clearer case of quantum advantage with Zuchongzhi is reported. A third study reported that Zuchongzhi 2.1 completed a task of classically simulating random circuit sampling that "is about 6 orders of magnitude more difficult than that of Sycamore".

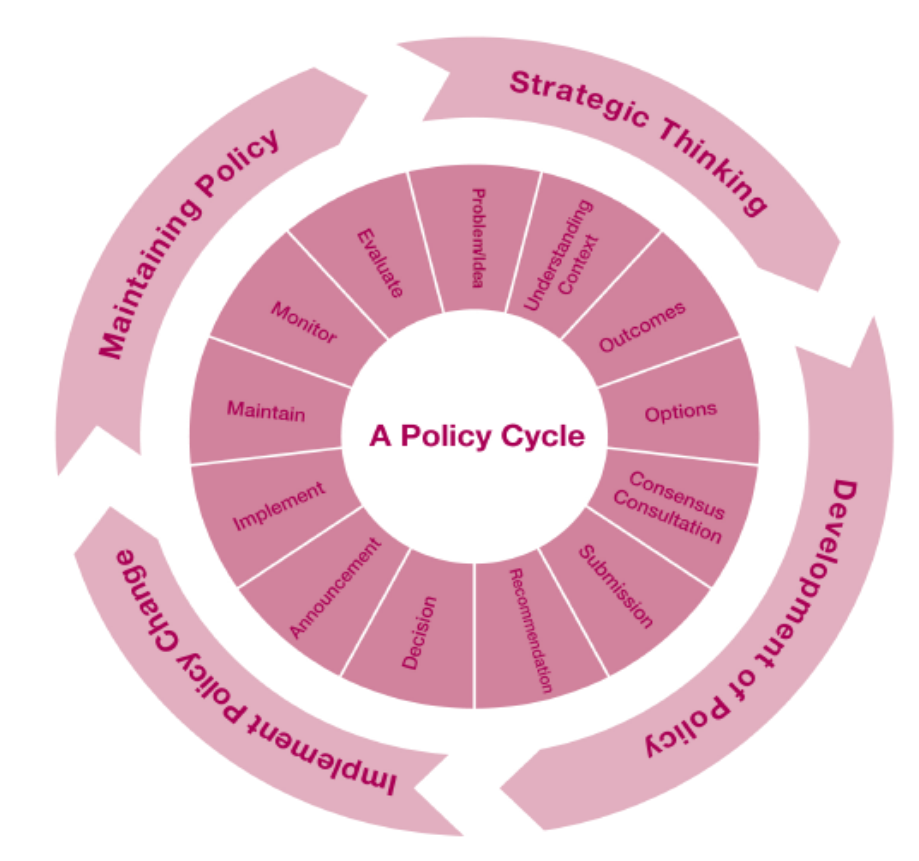
27 October: Researchers release a "policy sequencing" framework, in particular for policies of polycentric governance for completely halting and preventing deforestation.

- 27 October
  - Astronomers propose a "Confidence of Life Detection" scale (CoLD) for reporting evidence of life beyond Earth.
  - Astronomers report that the orbits of the detected exoplanets hosted by the star HD 3167 are unusual: two planets (HD 3167 c; HD 3167 d) revolve around the poles of the star, whereas the third planet (HD 3167 b) orbits around the equator of the star instead.
  - Researchers release a "policy sequencing" framework, in particular for policies of polycentric governance for completely halting and preventing deforestation based on data about already implemented government-designed policies, UN-decided REDD+ initiatives and voluntary private sector initiatives of recent deforestation interventions.
  - The world's first urban autonomous vessels, 'Roboats', are deployed in the canals of Amsterdam, Netherlands. The ships developed by three institutions could carry up to five people, collect waste, deliver goods, and provide "on-demand infrastructure".
  - A potentials-assessment study proposes hypothetical portable solar-powered atmospheric water harvesting devices which are under development, along with design criteria, finding they could help a billion people to access safe drinking water, albeit such off-the-grid generation may sometimes "undermine efforts to develop permanent piped infrastructure".
- 28 October
  - An open letter by almost 300 scientists asks the WTO to eliminate increasing harmful fisheries subsidies.
  - One year after India and South Africa called on WTO to temporarily waive TRIPS vaccine patents for accelerated deployment of COVID-19 vaccines around the world, the WTO reportedly fails to find an accord for doing so. No mechanisms of alternative medical research and development incentive-systems or technical details of proposed "sharing" after certain amounts of profit were reported and some argue that, instead of intellectual property rights, manufacturing know-how is the main barrier to expanding capacity.
  - Scientists discover that up to about 20,000 metric tons of microplastics may be stored in coral skeletons worldwide every year, marking the first time that a living microplastic "sink", or long-term storage site, has been quantified.
- 30 October – A comprehensive review summarizes scientific research and data about health impacts of climate change.

=== November ===
- 1 November – Astronomers report detecting, in a "first-of-its-kind" process based on SAM instruments, organic molecules, including benzoic acid, ammonia and other related unknown compounds, on the planet Mars by the Curiosity rover.

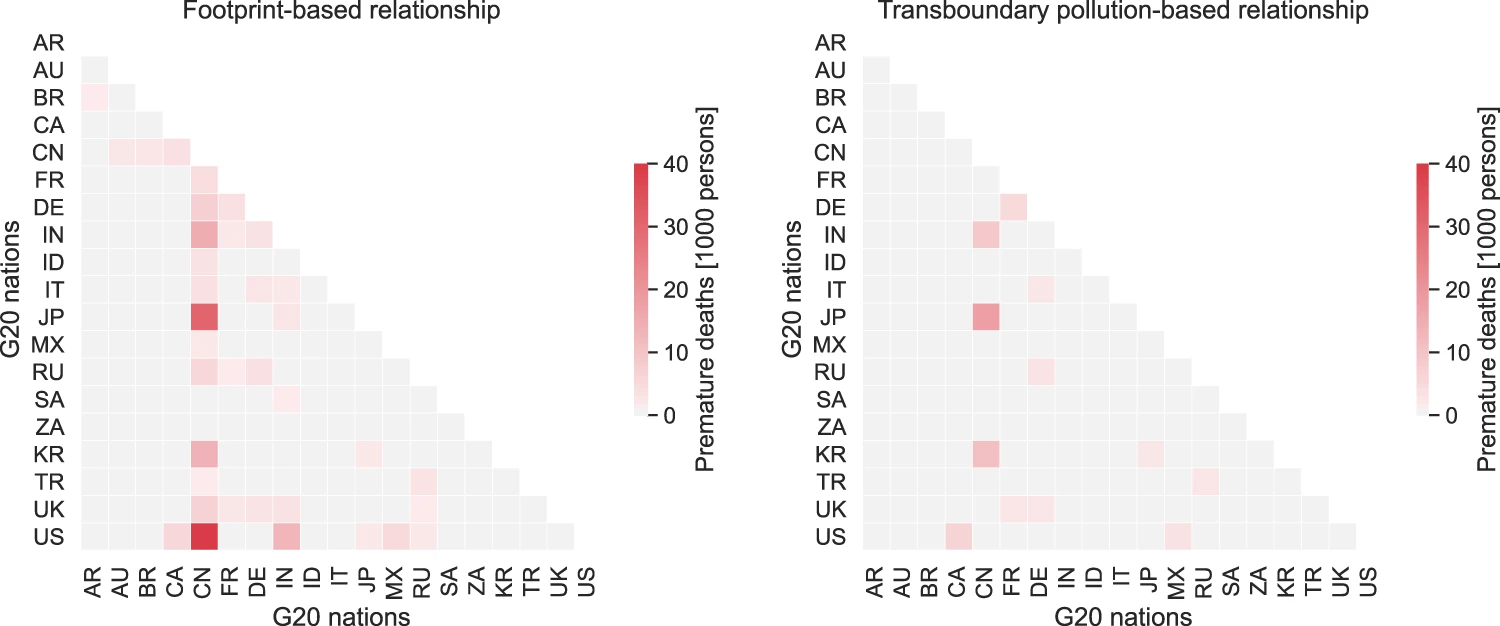
2 November: A study concludes that PM_{2.5} air pollution caused by the trade and consumption by the 19 G20 nations causes two million premature deaths annually.

- 2 November – A study concludes that PM_{2.5} air pollution induced by contemporary forms of free trade and consumption by the 19 G20 nations (the EU as a whole is not included) causes two million premature deaths annually, suggesting that the average lifetime consumption of about ~28 people in these countries causes at least one premature death (average age ~67) while developing countries "cannot be expected" to implement or be able to implement countermeasures without external support or internationally coordinated efforts.

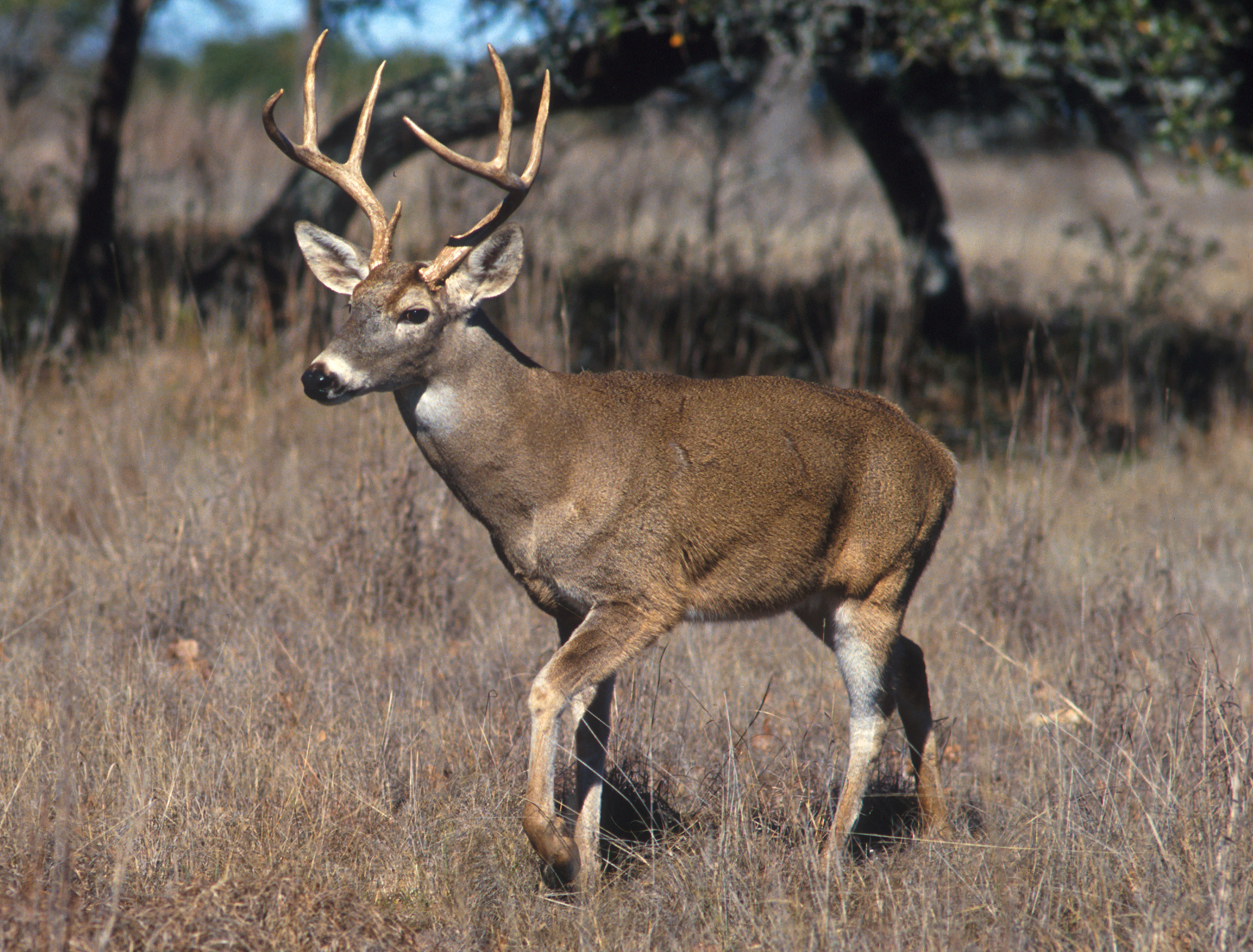
3 November: Scientists report that many wild deer in the U.S. got infected with SARS-CoV-2.

- 3 November
  - Astronomers using the ALMA report the presence of water in SPT0311-58, a galaxy nearly 12.9 billion light-years from Earth. This is the most distant detection of a required element for life in a regular star-forming galaxy.
  - Scientists report that large shares of wild deer in the U.S. have been infected with SARS-CoV-2. The test results showed one "mismatch" for 2019, low inhibition values in 2020 and 152 positive samples (40%) in 2021. A preprint published on 1 November found that ~80% of samples between late November 2020 and January were positive. Such spillovers may cause reservoirs for mutating variants that spill back to humans – a possible source for variants of concern other than immunocompromised people.
  - A review outlines research and data about COVID-19 vaccinations for children – recommended in the U.S. a day previously (for 5–11 years olds) by the CDC – including about populations-levels factors.

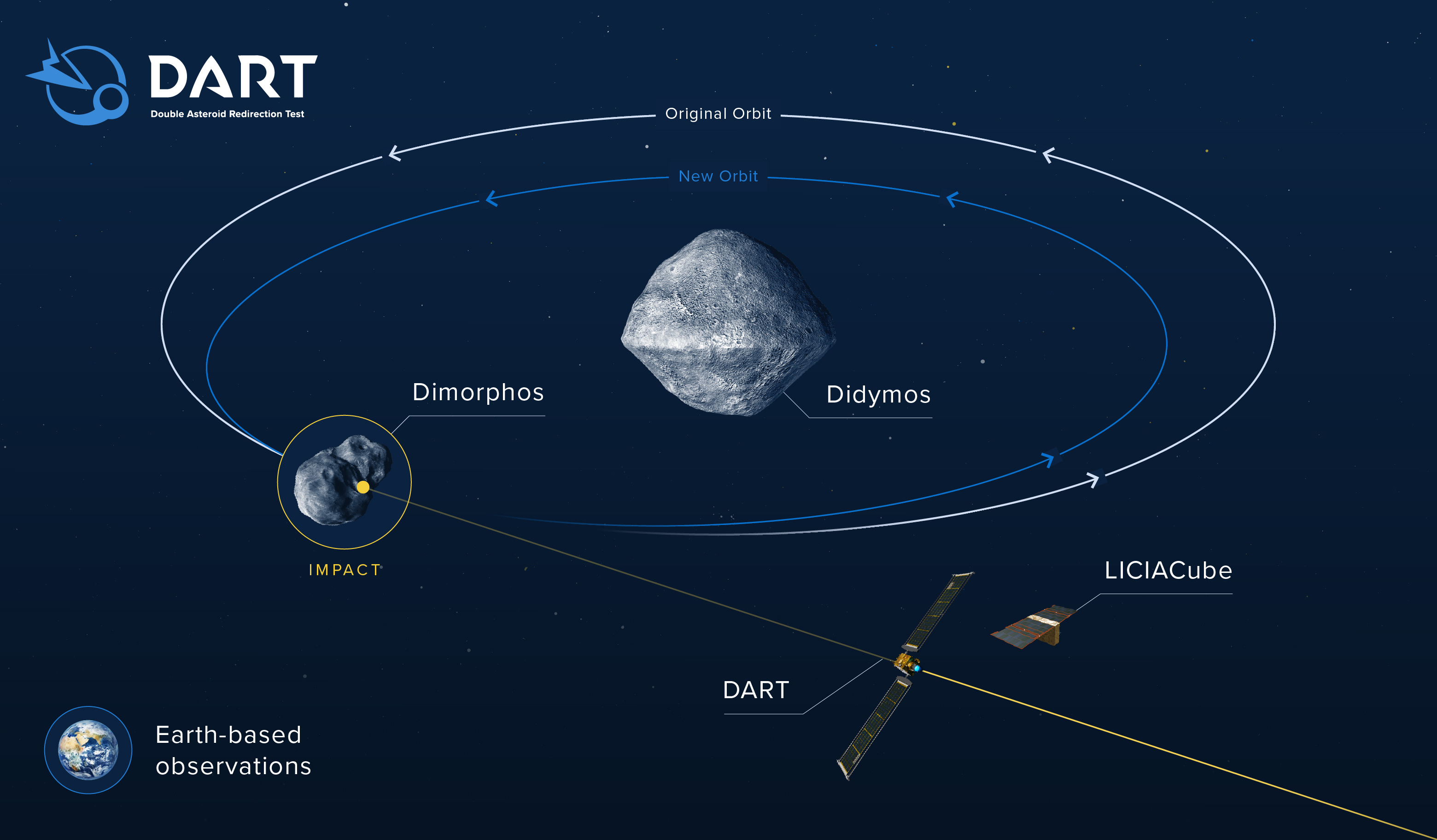
24 November: Launch of NASA's Double Asteroid Redirection Test (DART)

- 4 November
  - Astronomers report, in the Astronomy and Astrophysics Decadal Survey for the 2020s, recommended scientific priorities and investments for the next decade to help achieve the following primary goals: search for habitable exoplanets and extraterrestrial life, study black holes and neutron stars and study the growth and evolution of galaxies.
  - A study contributes to a disentangling of the current geopolitical and economic implications of and incentives for a swift renewable energy transition, suggesting i.a. that how fast fossil energy markets decline is primarily decided by the major energy importers China, India, Japan and the EU and that transition dynamics may reverse the free-rider problem in the case of energy sectors, specifically from strategic national standpoints which are not short-term.
  - Researchers demonstrate a novel X-ray imaging technique, "HiP-CT", for 3D cellular-resolution scans of whole organs, using the ESRF's EBF. The published online Human Organ Atlas includes the lungs from a donor who died with COVID-19.
- 5 November – A company reports that a phase 2/3 clinical trial shows that Paxlovid can reduce COVID-19 hospitalizations of high-risk adults by 89% when given within three days after symptom onset.
- 8 November – Scientists prove that the brain (the insular cortex of mice/mammals) also "remembers" immune activity against past infections, with reactivation – or stimulation – of the neurons being able to cause – or shape – the inflammatory immune response.
- 9 November
  - Astrophysicists report the discovery of unexplained blockage of high-energy cosmic rays entering the Galactic Center, such as a strong magnetic field.
  - Scientists report the detection of coronaviruses closely related to SARS-CoV-2 (92.6% nucleotide identity) in two bats sampled in Cambodia in 2010, complementing i.a. a study published on 17 September.
- 10 November – Researchers report the development of chewing gums that could mitigate COVID-19 spread. The ingredients – CTB-ACE2 proteins grown via plants – bind to the virus.
- 11 November
  - Astronomers using the Very Large Telescope report the discovery of a black hole in NGC 1850 by viewing its influence on the motion of a star in close proximity, the first direct dynamical detection of a black hole in a young massive cluster.
  - The first-ever simulation of baryons on a quantum computer is reported by a university.
  - Astronomers identify a long filament of cold, dense gas connecting two of the Milky Way's spiral arms, the first known observation of such a galactic structure in the Milky Way.
  - Bionanoengineers report a novel therapy for spinal cord injury – an injectable gel of nanofibers that contain moving molecules that cause cellular signaling and mimic the matrix around cells in mice.
  - A study investigates how tidal energy could be best integrated into the Orkney energy system. On 3 November, a review assesses the potential of tidal energy in the UK's energy systems, finding that it could, according to their considerations that include economic cost-benefit analysis, deliver 34 TWh/y or 11% of its energy demand.
- 14 November – A time-allocation study estimates that in 2020 over 130 million hours of researchers' time were spent on peer review.
- 16 November
  - A study reports the second case of a person whose immune system apparently cleared the HIV on its own without a therapy.
  - Biochemists report one of the first supercomputational approaches for the development of new antibiotic derivatives against antimicrobial resistance.
  - Scientists report a large extent of alternative splicing – cases of a single gene (a template) being used to create instructions (mRNAs) for building different proteins – in the mouse and human cortex and release the transcriptomes on a public database.
  - A tech company reveals a new 127 quantum bit processor named 'IBM Eagle', which is the most powerful quantum processor ever made.

26 November: The WHO reports the Omicron variant as a SARS-CoV-2 variant of concern. The image shows one Nextstrain-based visualization of genetic distance of several such variants.

- 17 November
  - A systematic review and meta-analysis finds that mask-wearing cuts the incidence of COVID-19 by 53%.
  - The first 256-qubit quantum computer is announced, by a startup company, founded by scientists and funded by DARPA.
  - The largest public dataset of whole genomes is made available through a Web platform. The entire genomes of 200,000 UK Biobank participants, linked to anonymized medical information, are made more accessible for biomedical research than prior, less comprehensive datasets.
  - Scientists call for the creation of space biosecurity measures and inform the creation of planetary protection policies that aim to prevent forward contamination of extraterrestrial bodies as well as backward contamination.
  - Scientists report the development of a vaccine of mRNAs for the body build 19 proteins in tick saliva which, by enabling quick development of erythema (itchy redness) at the bite site, protects guinea pigs against Lyme disease from ticks.
- 19 November
  - The first autonomous cargo ship, MV Yara Birkeland is launched in Norway. The fully electric ship is expected to substantially reduce the need for truck journeys.
  - A report by Brazil's INPE based on satellite data finds deforestation of the Amazon rainforest has increased by 22% over 2020 and is at its highest level (13,235 km^{2}) since 2006.
- 21 November – Sri Lanka announces that it will lift its import ban on pesticides and herbicides, explained by both a lack of sudden changes to widely applied practices or education systems and contemporary economics and, by extension, food security, protests and high food costs. The effort to become the world's first completely organic farming nation was challenged by effects of the COVID-19 pandemic.
- 22 November
  - Scientists detect a quantum effect that blocks atoms from scattering light.
  - A study using data on ~30,000 patients, for the first time, indicates that aspirin may be associated with an increased (26%) risk for heart failure in persons with at least one cardiovascular risk factor. An author notes that the findings require confirmation and the link with heart failure to be clarified.
- 24 November – NASA launches the Double Asteroid Redirection Test (DART), the first attempt to deflect an asteroid for the purpose of learning how to protect Earth.
- 25 November – Researchers systematically assess impacts of climate change mitigation options on 18 constituents of well-being, finding largely beneficial effects of demand-side solutions based on inputs from 604 studies.
- 26 November – The WHO announces the classification of the Omicron variant as a SARS-CoV-2 variant of concern. The variant, that became dominant (74% of samples) in South Africa in November, was detected by the NGS-SA genomic surveillance on 8 November and reported to the WHO on 24 November. It has a large number of mutations that, according to early preliminary evidence, appear to increase risk of reinfection, may increase transmissibility compared to Delta and may affect vaccines' efficacies with a key question being whether it causes less severe prognoses.
- 29 November – A team of scientists reports a new form of biological reproduction in xenobots that are made up of and are emersed in frog cells.

=== December ===
- 1 December
  - Scientists discover the footprint of an ancient hominid that lived alongside Lucy.
  - Researchers develop an energy system model for 100% renewable energy, examining feasibility and grid stability in the U.S.
- 2 December
  - A method of DNA data storage with a hundred times the density of previous techniques is announced.
  - A stem cell-based treatment for type 1 diabetes is announced.
- 3 December – Scientists demonstrate that grown brain cells integrated into digital systems can carry out goal-directed tasks with performance-scores. In particular, playing a simulated (via electrophysiological stimulation) Pong which the cells learned to play faster than known machine intelligence systems, albeit to a lower skill-level than both AI and humans. Moreover, the study suggests it provides first empirical evidence of information-processing capacity differences between neurons from different species.
- 4 December – A total solar eclipse occurs in the Antarctic region.
- 5 December – Researchers report the development of a system of machine learning and hyperspectral camera that can distinguish between 12 different types of plastics such as PET and PP for automated separation of waste of, as of 2020, highly unstandardized plastics products and packaging.
- 6 December
  - Scientists show that and how the flavonoid Procyanidin C1 of the antioxidant grape seed extract increases the health- and lifespan of mice and increases the efficacy of mice' chemotherapy.
  - Sloan Digital Sky Survey's final data release of SDSS-IV including final data products and catalogs.

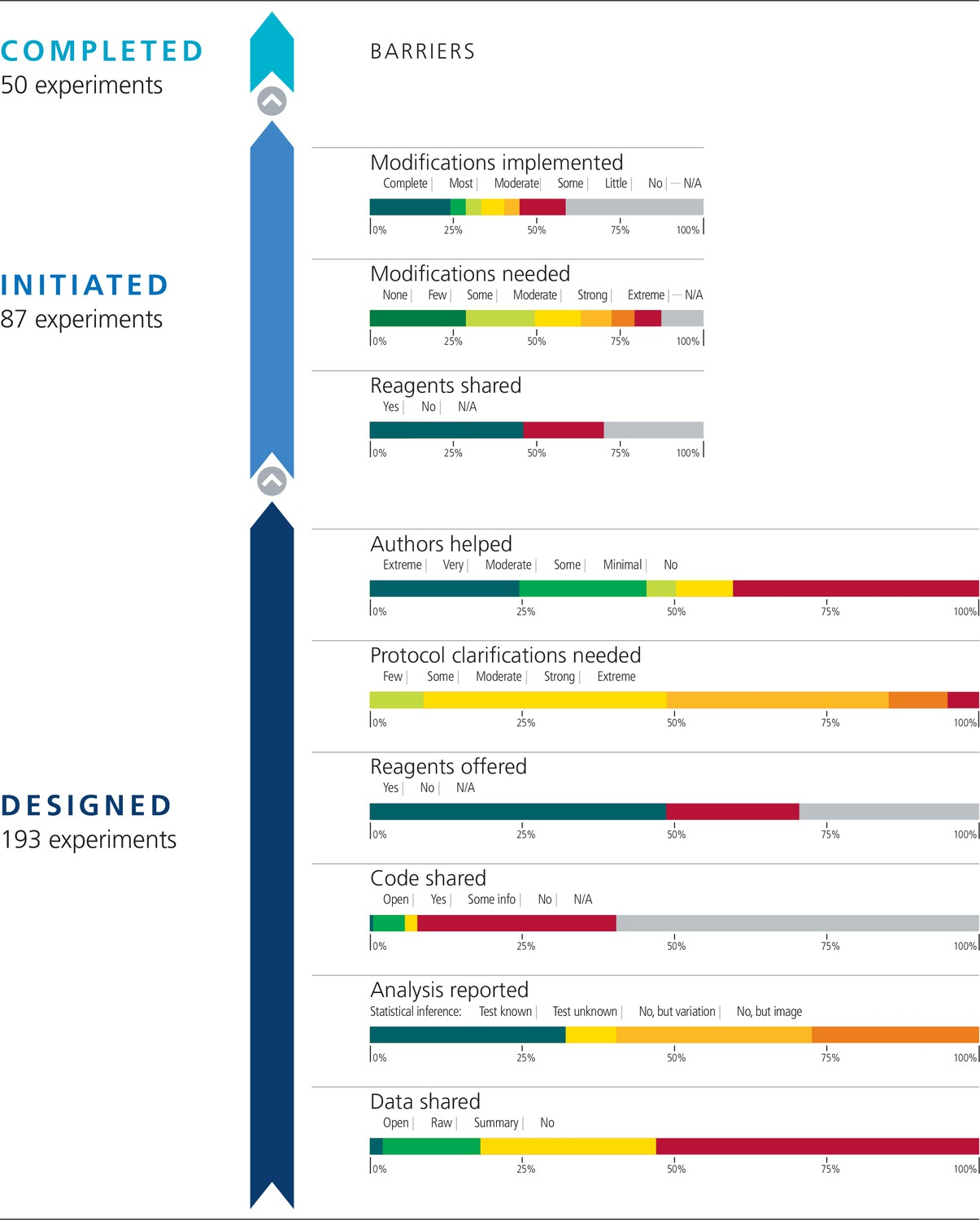
7 December: Results from the Reproducibility Project: Cancer Biology suggest most studies of the cancer research sector may not be replicable and may contain wrong results.

- 7 December
  - A study suggests that when two people wear surgical masks, while the infectious one is speaking, the risk of COVID-19 infection at a distance of 1.5 m remains below 30% after one hour, but when both wear a well-fitting FFP2 mask, it is 0.4%.
  - Researchers investigating sources of urban PAHs air pollution in Athens report that wood-burning could be causing a third (31%) of such urban air pollution, like diesel and oil combined or gasoline, and, especially during winter days, is responsible for nearly half of PAH cancer-risk.
  - A study suggests that mutations that promote breakthrough infections or antibody-resistance could be a new mechanism for viral evolution success of SARS-CoV-2 and that such may become a dominating mechanism of its evolution. On 27 December, a preprint finds that "the rapid spread of the Omicron VOC primarily can be ascribed to the immune evasiveness rather than an inherent increase in the basic transmissibility". Studies also showed the variant to escape the majority of existing SARS-CoV-2 neutralizing antibodies, including of sera from vaccinated and convalescent individuals.
  - A scientific review summarizes research and data about telemedicine. Its results indicate that, in general, outcomes of such ICT-use are as good as in-person care with health care use staying similar.
  - The Reproducibility Project: Cancer Biology shows that of 193 experiments from 53 top papers about cancer published between 2010 and 2012, only 50 replication experiments from 23 papers could be completed with effect sizes of that fraction being 85% smaller on average than the original findings. None of the papers had its experimental protocols fully described and 70% of experiments required asking for key reagents.
- 8 December
  - Researchers report the development of face masks that glow under ultraviolet light if they contain SARS-CoV-2 when the filter is taken out and sprayed with a fluorescent dye that contains antibodies from ostrich eggs.
  - Studies, some of which using large nationwide datasets from either Israel and Denmark, find that vaccine effectiveness of multiple common two-dosed COVID-19 vaccines is substantially lower against the SARS-CoV-2 Omicron variant than for other common variants including the Delta variant, and that a new (often a third) dose – a booster dose – is needed and effective, with it i.a. substantially reducing deaths from the disease compared to cohorts who received two doses.
  - Applied behavioural scientists demonstrate a novel type of intervention studies, a "megastudy", and investigate the efficacy of 54 different designed by separate teams interventions to increase weekly gym-visits of ~60,000 members of a fitness chain, such as digital feedback in the form of redeemable points that are rewarded for returning to the gym after a missed workout.
- 9 December
  - The Imaging X-ray Polarimetry Explorer, a collaboration between NASA and the Italian Space Agency, is launched by SpaceX. It is the first satellite capable of measuring the polarisation of X-rays that come from cosmic sources, such as black holes and neutron stars.
  - The Log4Shell security vulnerability in a Java logging framework is publicly disclosed two weeks after its discovery. Because of the ubiquity of the affected software, experts have described it as a most serious computer vulnerability. In a high-level meeting, the importance of security maintenance of open-source software – often also carried out largely by few volunteers – to national security was clarified.
  - A study reviews modern analytic procedures, including mass spectrometry techniques, for characterization, analysis, and identification of unknown materials and how such were applied to study materials that, according to witnesses, dropped from hovering unknown aerial objects (or UFOs). It suggests that the full range of current capabilities of materials analysis have not been applied so far and, after reviewing a range of proposed explanations, that these materials' purposes and characteristics, such as their isotope ratios, are very odd and remain unexplained.
  - Scientists report the development of a genome editing system, called "twin prime editing", which surpasses the original prime editing system reported in 2019 in that it allows editing large sequences of DNA, addressing the method's key drawback.
  - An mRNA vaccine against HIV with promising results in tests with mice and primates is reported.

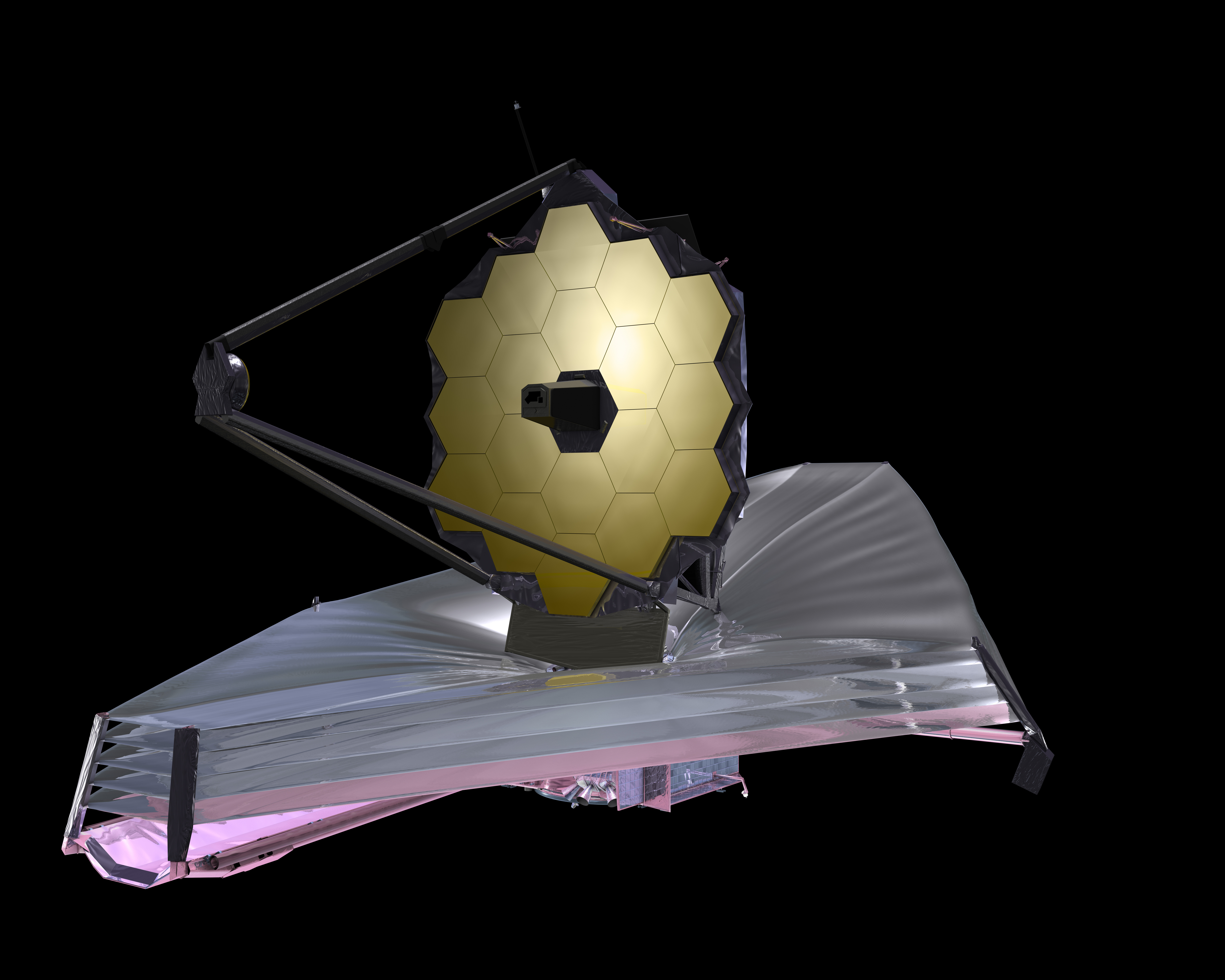
25 December: The James Webb Space Telescope, the long-awaited successor to the Hubble Space Telescope, is launched.

- 10 December – A vaccine to remove senescent cells, a key driver of the aging process, is demonstrated in mice by researchers from Japan.
- 13 December
  - Astronomers report that AT 2018cow, an extreme FBOT, "could be a neutron star or black hole with a mass less than 850 solar masses," based on high-time-resolution X-ray observation studies.
  - Scientists studying the huge Thwaites Glacier in West Antarctica report evidence that it could "shatter like a car windscreen" within five to ten years, potentially adding 65 cm to global sea levels in the long term.
  - Observations of 16 years of timing data from the double pulsar PSR J0737−3039 are reported to be in agreement with general relativity by studying the loss of orbital energy due to gravitational waves.
  - Researchers report the development of a database and analysis tool about perovskite solar cells which systematically integrates over 15,000 publications, in particular data about over 42,400 photovoltaic devices.
- 14 December – Sagittarius A*, the supermassive black hole at the centre of the Milky Way, is imaged with 20 times greater detail than ever before, by astronomers using the GRAVITY instrument on the Very Large Telescope in Chile.
- 15 December
  - Scientists call for accelerated efforts in the development of broadly protective vaccines, especially a universal coronavirus vaccine that durably protects not just against all SARS-CoV-2 variants but also other coronaviruses, including already identified animal coronaviruses with pandemic potential.
  - Researchers report that NOX4 facilitates certain beneficial adaptive responses to exercise mediated by ROS (the opposite of antioxidants), which may be relevant to aging, diabetes, muscle-related and obesity interventions.
- 16 December
  - Tokamak Energy announces a more efficient design for the cryogenic electronics in fusion reactors. This provides a 50% reduction in the power needed for the cooling of high-temperature superconducting magnets.
  - Researchers propose buffer-zones around nature reserves where pesticide-use is drastically reduced, based on Germany-wide field study data which i.a. found insect samples in such areas to be contaminated with ~16 pesticides on average.
  - Researchers report the development of perovskite solar cells based on self-constructed high-throughput screening of mixtures and contact layers, that – based on the stability tests – are estimated to last for over two years under normal circumstances.
  - In two separate studies, researchers, using vanadium dioxide, report the development of a "smart-roof coating" for radiative cooling that switches to warming during cold temperatures and "smart windows" that self-adapt to heat or cool for energy conservation in buildings.
- 20 December – The first known magnetosphere around an exoplanet is reported, surrounding the hot Neptune HAT-P-11b.
- 22 December – Japanese scientists announce a key step in the development of a quantum computer using photons, which eliminates the need for an ultracold environment used to cool existing machines.
- 23 December – An international team reports the use of an electron microscope to change the chirality of a carbon nanotube, creating a transistor with a length of just 2.8 nanometres.
- 24 December – A study suggests that, based on the strength of positive selection pressure, the molecular spectrum of mutations and known mutations for adaptation to mouse hosts, the SARS-CoV-2 Omicron variant may have evolved in mice and then spilled back to humans.
- 25 December – The James Webb Space Telescope, "NASA's most powerful and complex space telescope" and successor to the Hubble Space Telescope, launches successfully.
- 26 December – A third convergent graphical shell and UI framework, based on KDE/Kirigami, for the Linux operating system on phones, desktops and other devices, is released.
- 28 December – Scientists report that production of ammonia in the clouds of Venus, possibly by life, may make the environment less acidic and suitable for life, with the atmospheric model matching observations better than earlier ones.
- 30 December
  - China's EAST tokamak sustains 120 million °C plasma for 17 minutes (1,056 seconds) for the development of fusion energy (which requires i.a. temperatures over 150 million °C).
  - Researchers report the development of "nanoantennas" made out of DNA that attach to proteins and produce a signal via fluorescence when these perform their biological functions, in particular for distinct conformational changes, i.a. enabling monitoring their motion.
  - The first CRISPR-gene-edited marine animals/seafood and second set of CRISPR-edited food has gone on public sale in Japan: two fish of which one species grows to twice the size of natural specimens due to disruption of leptin, which controls appetite, and the other grows to 1.2 the natural size with the same amount of food due to disabled myostatin, which inhibits muscle growth.

== Predicted and scheduled events ==
=== Later date ===
- Engineering first light of the Vera C. Rubin Observatory's camera was anticipated for 2021 with full science operations to begin a year later. Delayed to October 2022 and later to February 2023 due to the COVID-19 pandemic. First light images were released in June 2025.

== Awards ==
- Nobel Prize in Physiology or Medicine – David Julius and Ardem Patapoutian for their discoveries of receptors for [i.a.] temperature and touch [the discovery/mechanics of TRPV1 and PIEZO2]
- Nobel Prize in Physics – Syukuro Manabe and Klaus Hasselmann (1/2) "for the physical modelling of Earth's climate, quantifying variability and reliably predicting global warming" and Giorgio Parisi (1/2) "for the discovery of the interplay of disorder and fluctuations in physical systems from atomic to planetary scales" – all of which "for groundbreaking contributions to our understanding of complex systems"
- Nobel Prize in Chemistry – Benjamin List and David W.C. MacMillan "for the development of asymmetric organocatalysis"

== Deaths ==
- 4 January – Martinus J. G. Veltman, Dutch theoretical physicist and Nobel Prize laureate (b. 1931)
- 28 January – Paul J. Crutzen, Dutch meteorologist and atmospheric chemist, Nobel Prize laureate (b. 1933)
- 16 February – Bernard Lown, Lithuanian-born American inventor and cardiologist (b. 1921)
- 1 April – Isamu Akasaki, Japanese engineer and physicist, Nobel Prize laureate (b. 1929)
- 4 April – Robert Mundell, Canadian economist (b. 1932)
- 4 June – Richard R. Ernst, Swiss physical chemist, Nobel Prize laureate (b. 1933)
- 6 June – Ei-ichi Negishi, Japanese chemist, Nobel Prize laureate (b. 1935)
- 23 July – Toshihide Maskawa, Japanese physicist, Nobel Prize laureate (b. 1940)
- 23 July – Steven Weinberg, American physicist, Nobel Prize laureate (b. 1933)

== See also ==
- Category:Science events
- Category:Science timelines
- Impact of the COVID-19 pandemic on science and technology
- List of technologies
- List of emerging technologies
- List of years in science
