= April–June 2021 in science =

This article lists a number of significant events in science that have occurred in the second quarter of 2021.

== Events ==
=== April ===
Science Summary video for this section

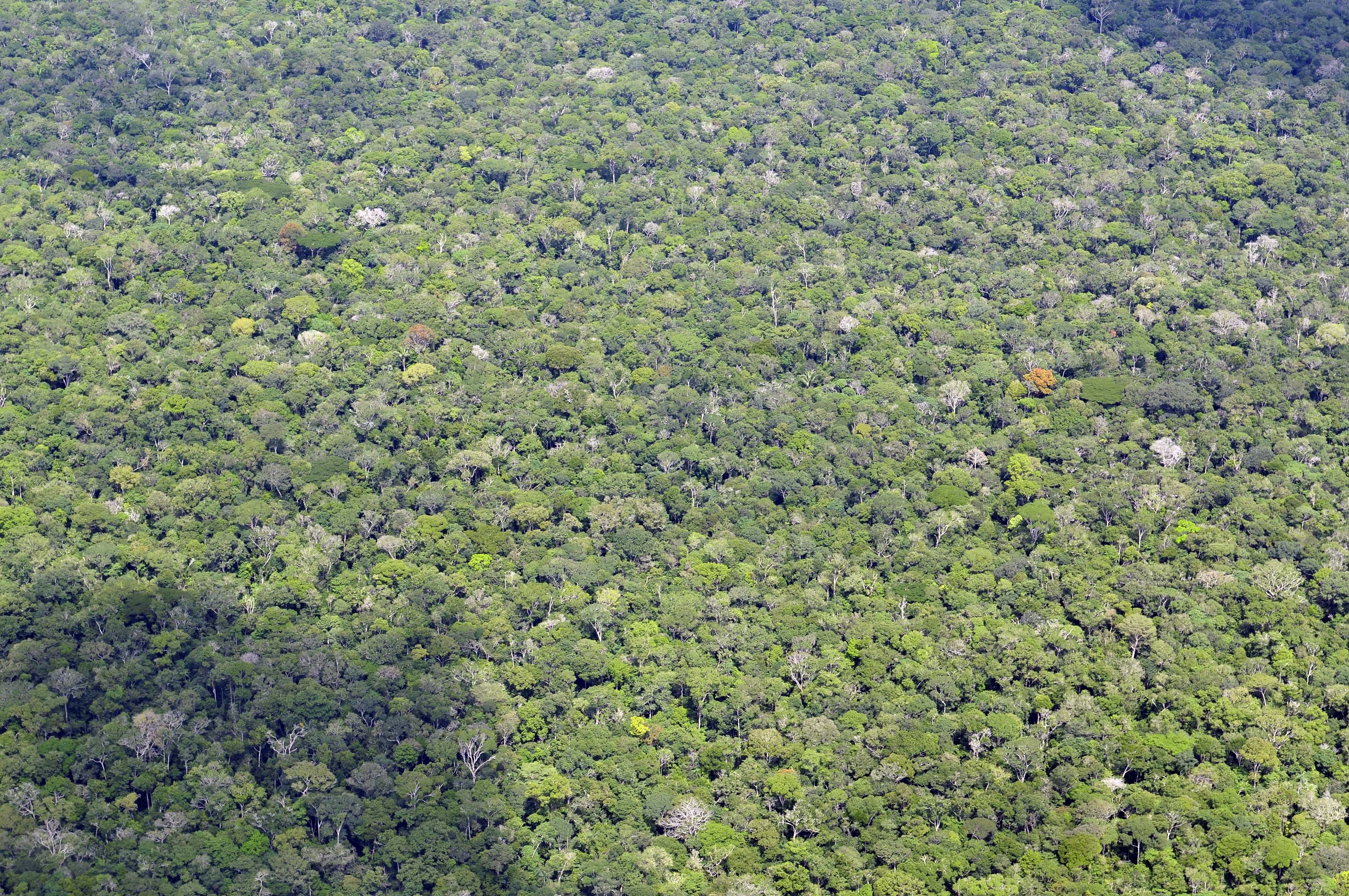
2 April: Scientists describe how the dinosaur-killing impact is an origin of neotropical rainforests like the Amazonia and replaced its species composition.

- 2 April – Scientists report that the event that caused the mass-extinction of non-avian dinosaurs gave rise to neotropical rainforest biomes like the Amazonia, replacing species composition and structure of local forests. During ~6 million years of recovery to former levels of plant diversity, they evolved from widely spaced gymnosperm-dominated forests to the forests with thick canopies which block sunlight, prevalent flowering plants and high vertical layering as known today.

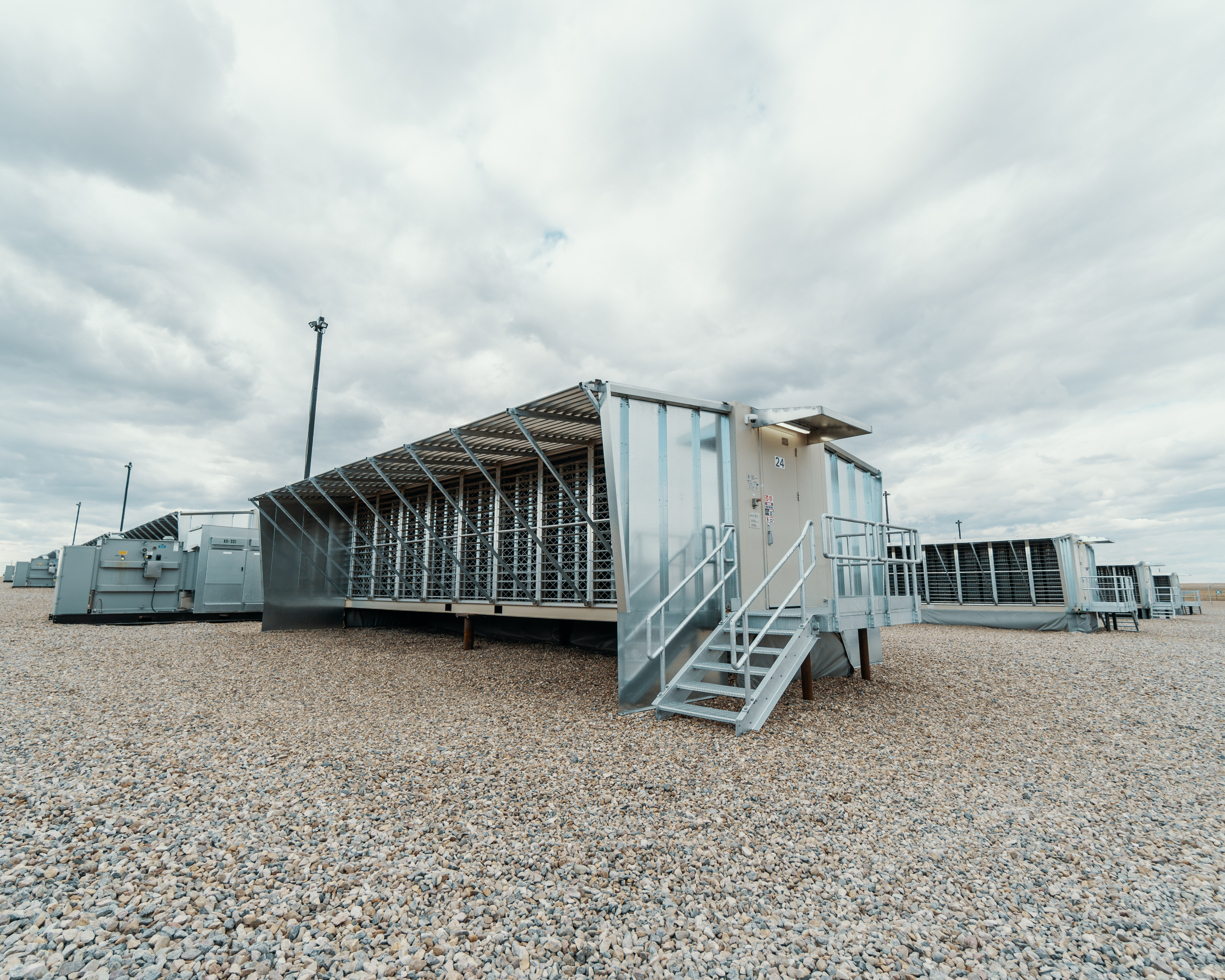
6 April: A study finds that carbon emissions from Bitcoin mining within China are about to exceed the total annual carbon emissions of countries like Italy (within an estimated ~3 years).

- 6 April
  - A study finds that carbon emissions from Bitcoin mining in China – where a majority of the proof-of-work algorithm that generates current economic value is computed, largely fueled by nonrenewable sources – have accelerated rapidly, would soon exceed total annual emissions of European countries like Italy and Spain in 2016 and interfere with climate change mitigation commitments.
  - COVID-19 pandemic: Scientists report the "estimated incidence of a neurological or psychiatric diagnosis in the following 6 months" after diagnosed COVID-19 infection was 33.62% with 12.84% "receiving their first such diagnosis" and higher risks being associated with COVID-19 severity.

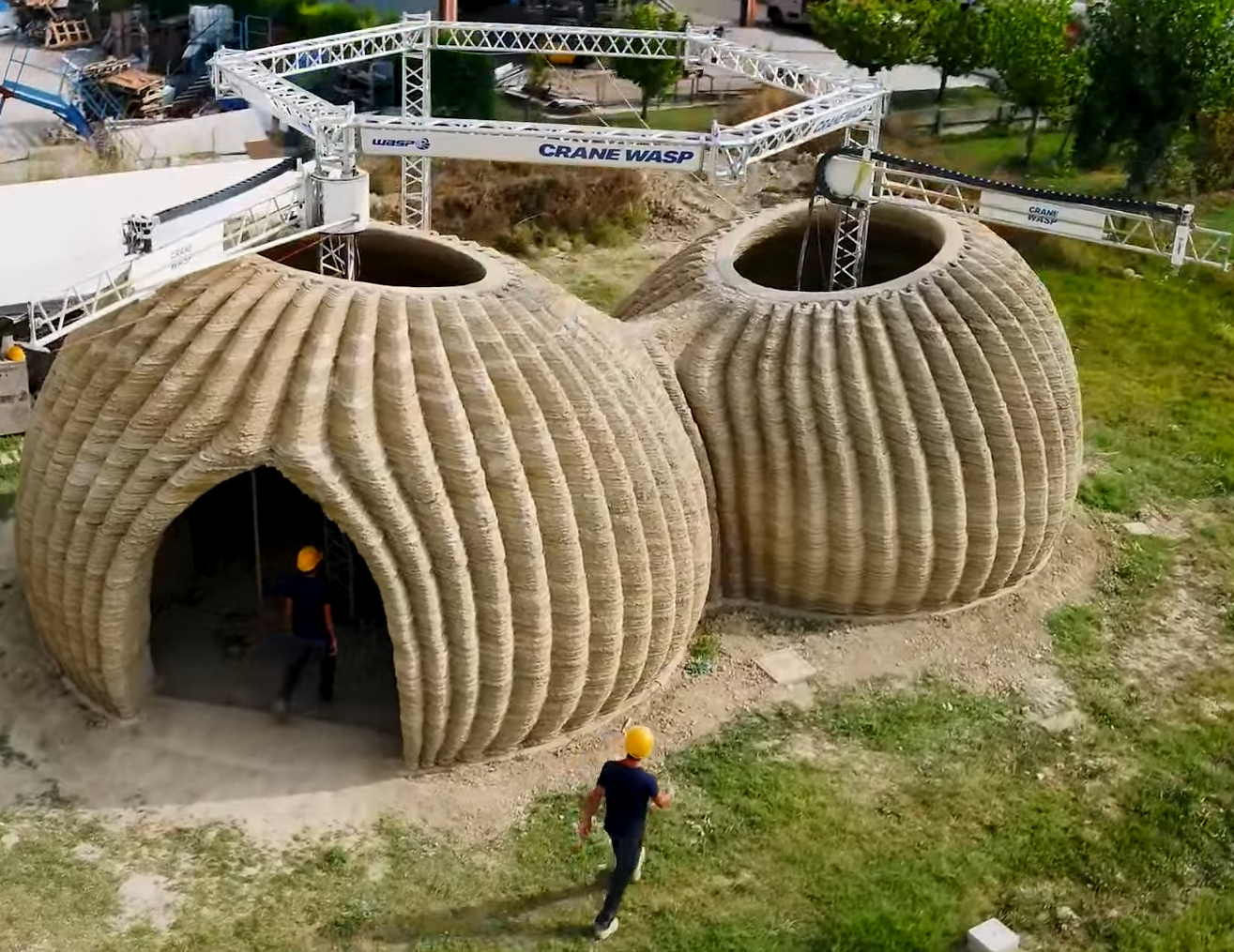
12 April: The construction of the first (eco-)house 3D printed from clay, Tecla, is completed.

- 7 April
  - Physicists report that results from muon g-2 studies involving the muon subatomic particle challenge the Standard Model and, accordingly, may require an updating of currently understood physics.
  - NOAA reports the largest annual increase in methane emissions since records began, with a rise of 14.7 parts per billion (ppb) in 2020.
  - A study finds that humans engaged in problem-solving tend to overlook subtractive changes, including those that are critical elements of efficient solutions. This tendency to solve by creating or adding elements is shown to intensify with higher cognitive loads in the case of individuals.
  - Scientists report one of the two oldest known reconstructed modern human genomes to date (~45.000 ya) which was found in Koněprusy Caves, Czech Republic, includes long Neanderthal segments and considered to be close to a population that later branched to present-day Europeans and Asians.
  - Scientists confirm, with new genomic data, that initial European modern humans mixed with Neanderthals with continuity to later people in Eurasia and report that such admixture appears to have been more common than previously thought.
- 8 April – Scientists report rough spectral signatures of 958 molecules that may be involved in the atmospheric production or consumption of phosphine, which could prevent misassignments and, if accuracy is improved, be used in future detections and identifications of molecules on other planets such as Venus. On 10 April, a news report informs about a launched NASA-funded mission to design and test robotic balloons for future scientific exploration of Venus. On 19 April scientists who reported the detection of well-established or likely biosignature, monophosphine, on Venus publish a preprint recovering the detection of PH_{3} in the Venusian atmosphere – which was challenged by critical studies – with the proposed SO_{2}-attribution alternative being inconsistent with the available data.
- 9 April
  - Neuralink reveals a male macaque with chips embedded on each side of its brain, playing a mind-controlled version of Pong.
  - Scientists show that the brains of early Homo from Africa and Dmanisi, Western Asia "retained primitive, great ape-like organization of the frontal lobe" until ~1.5 million years ago and therefore long after Homo emerged and first dispersed from Africa – much later than previously thought (~2.5 Mya).
  - Scientists present a tool for epigenome editing, CRISPRoff, that can heritably silence the gene expression of "most genes" and allows for reversible modifications.
- 12 April
  - The magazine Scientific American announces that it will stop using the term "climate change" in articles about human-caused global warming and substitute "climate emergency" instead.
  - News outlets report that the first prototype 3D printed house made out of clay, Tecla, has been completed. The low-carbon housing was printed by two large arms from a mix that includes locally sourced soil and water. Such buildings could be highly cheap, well-insulated, stable, get produced rapidly, require only very little easily learnable manual labor, mitigate carbon emissions from concrete, require less energy, reduce homelessness, help enable intentional communities, and enable the provision of housing for victims of natural disasters as well as for migrants to Europe near their homes, rather than political facilitation of their influx.
  - Scientists develop a prototype and design rules for both-sides-contacted silicon solar cells with conversion efficiencies of 26% and above, Earth's highest for this type of solar cell.
- 13 April
  - Scientists report the discovery of a billion-years-old, likely holozoan, protist, Bicellum brasieri, showing that the evolution of differentiated multicellularity – such as of animal lineages – occurred at least 1 bn years ago and possibly mainly in freshwater lakes rather than the ocean.
  - In a preprint, an astronomer describes for the first time how one could search for quantum communication transmissions sent by ETI using existing telescope and receiver technology. He also provides arguments for why future searches of SETI should also target interstellar quantum communications.
  - COVID-19 pandemic: Scientists report that patients who consistently met scientific guidelines of 150+ min/week exercise or similar physical activity had a smaller risk of hospitalisation and death due to COVID-19, even when considering likely risk factors such as elevated BMI.
- 14 April – Astronomers report that the supermassive black hole M87*, first, and to date, the only black hole to be imaged, will be further studied by many observatories from around the world and present results of simultaneous observations and their subsequent analysis.

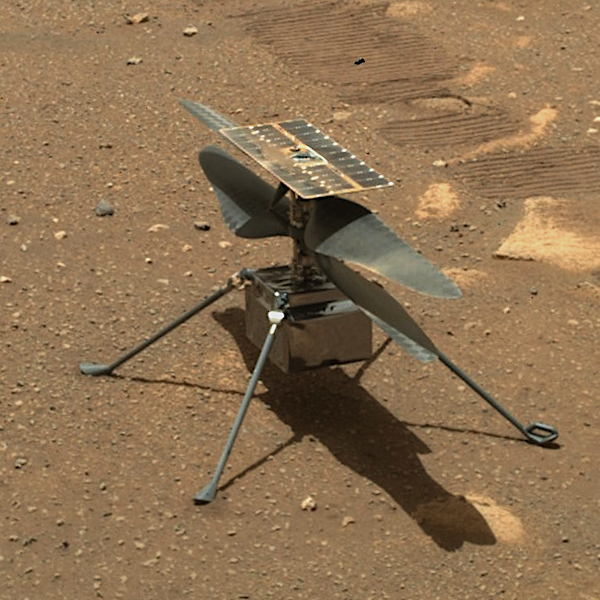
19 April: The semi-autonomous Mars helicopter Ingenuity performs the first powered aircraft flight on another planet in human history.

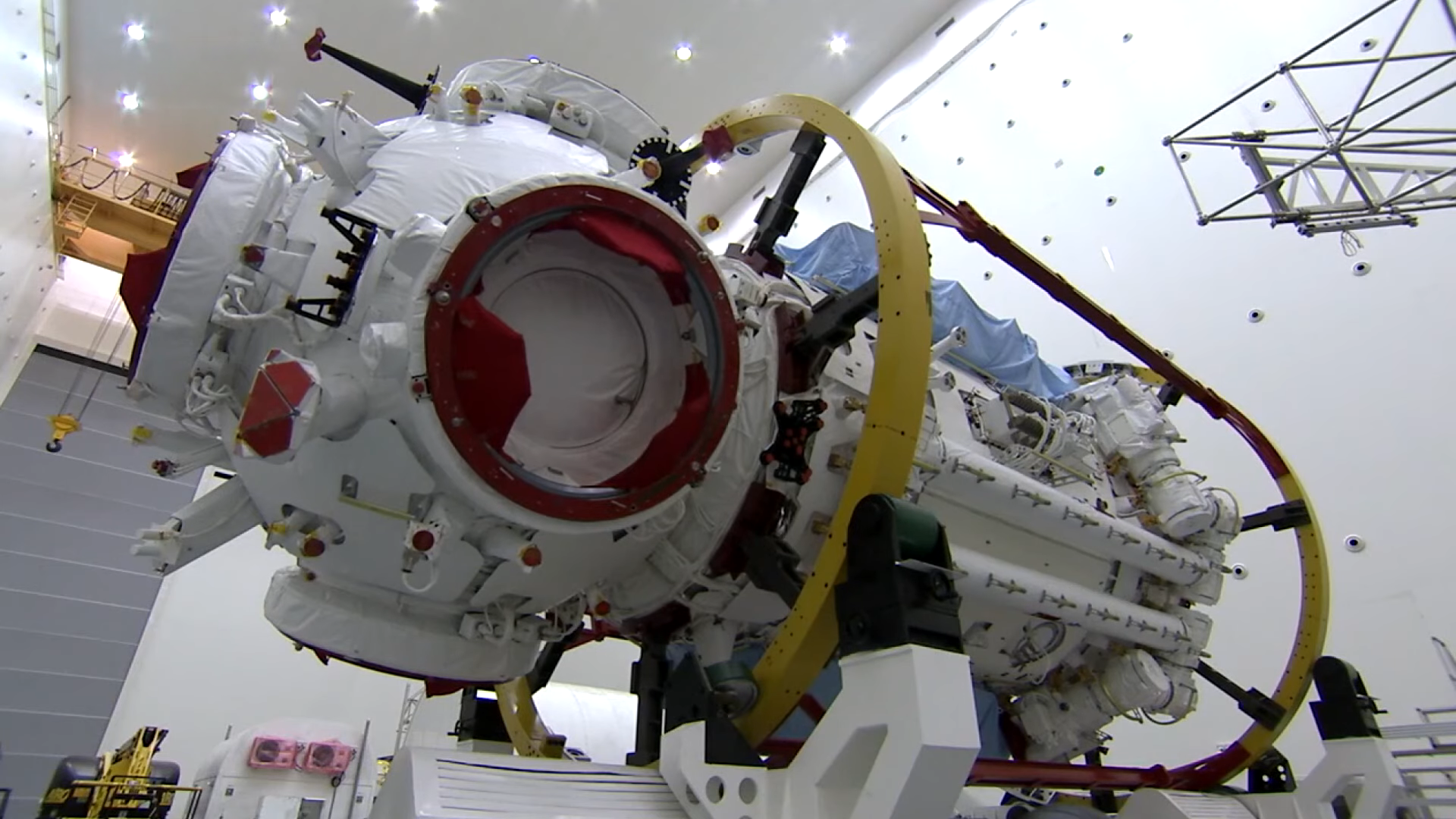
29 April: The first, core module of the Chinese Tiangong space station is put into orbit.

- 15 April
  - COVID-19 pandemic: The CDC, according to numerous media sources, reports that there were 5,800 COVID-19 breakthrough infections, and 74 deaths, in people fully vaccinated for the COVID-19 virus. On 21 April, scientists report that in a cohort of 417 vaccinated persons 2 women had vaccine breakthrough infections and identify their variants' viral mutations.
  - Scientists report the creation, for the first time, of human-monkey hybrid embryos.
  - Biologists report that an estimated 2.5 billion adult Tyrannosaurus rex dinosaurs roamed the Earth over the 2.4 million years of their existence.
  - A study assesses that only 3% of the planet's terrestrial surface is ecologically and faunally "intact", with low human footprint and healthy populations of native animal species.
  - Researchers demonstrate the whitest ever paint formulation, which reflects up to 98.1% of sunlight and could be used in place of air conditioners.
- 16 April – Scientists report that in the case of Alaskan forests, such boreal forests recovered from wildfires by shifting to a deciduous-coniferous mix, which could offset the carbon emitted during the fires.
- 17 April – New Horizons reaches a distance of 50 astronomical units (AU) from the Sun, while remaining fully operational.
- 19 April – NASA's Ingenuity helicopter, part of the Mars 2020 mission, performs the first powered aircraft flight in history not to take place on earth. The test location is named "Wright Brothers Field".
- 20 April
  - Perseverance performs a test of its MOXIE instrument to convert carbon dioxide into oxygen for the first time on Mars.
  - The Ivanti Pulse Connect Secure data breach of unauthorized access to the networks of high-value targets since at least June 2020 via CVE-2021-22893 across the U.S. and some E.U. nations due to their use of vulnerable, proprietary software is reported.
  - Scientists show that a class of warp drives that are slower than light, could control the rate of time within the spaceship and are sourced from positive energy could in principle possibly be constructed based on known physical principles. Furthermore, they provide a new argument "why superluminal warp drive solutions may always violate weak energy conditions" and that the concept proposed in a study published in March "likely forms a new class of warp drive spacetimes".
- 23 April
  - A malaria vaccine with 77% efficacy after 1 year – and first to meet the WHO's goal of 75% efficacy – is reported by the University of Oxford.
  - Scientists report that of ~39 million groundwater wells 6-20% are at high risk of running dry if local groundwater levels decline by a few meters, or – as with many areas and possibly more than half of major aquifers – continue to decline.
- 27 April – Astronomers report the discovery of TOI-1431b, an "ultra-hot Jupiter" with a dayside temperature of ~3,000K (2,700 °C), making it one of the hottest exoplanets found to date.
- 29 April – The first, core module of the Chinese Tiangong space station, Tianhe, is placed in low Earth orbit. It is one of three permanent modules intended to be fully assembled in 2022 for a designed lifespan of 10–15 years, is 16.6 m in size and could host three astronaut scientists.

=== May ===
Science Summary video for this section

- 1 May
  - A study that follows up on the randomized Abecedarian Early Intervention Project shows that 5 years of cognitively and linguistically stimulating center-based care starting between 3 and 21 weeks of age can result in significant changes in midlife brain structure in males.
  - A meta-analysis of randomized trials suggests that lowering blood pressure at normal or high-normal blood pressure ranges is effective for prevention of major cardiovascular disease.
- 4 May
  - Genetic signatures linked to extreme longevity in humans are identified by researchers and include genes for efficient DNA repair.
  - A study assesses benefits of fast action to reduce methane emissions when compared to slower climate change mitigation of this form. On 6 May a U.N. report assesses benefits and costs of rapidly mitigating methane emissions.
- 5 May – Scientists report that Mediterranean diets protect against memory decline and mediotemporal atrophy such as in Alzheimer's by decreasing amyloidosis and tau-pathology.
- 6 May
  - Researchers find that China's CO_{2} emissions surpassed that of all OECD countries combined for the first time in 2019. On 20 May China's CO_{2} emissions are found to be 9% higher than pre-COVID-19-pandemic levels in 2021-Q1 with CO_{2} emissions from fossil fuels and cement production having grown by 14.5% compared to 2020.
  - Researchers report that bees were successfully trained to detect COVID-19 infections via samples.
  - Researchers publish the first in-depth study of Web browser tab interfaces in over a decade and provide UI design considerations.
- 7 May
  - Operation of the U.S. Colonial Pipeline is interrupted by a ransomware cyber intrusion.
  - Researchers address a key problem of perovskite solar cells by increasing their stability and long-term reliability with a form of "molecular glue".
  - Two studies complement research published September 2020 by quantum-entangling two mechanical oscillators.
- 10 May – A pan-coronavirus mRNA nanoparticle vaccine with activity against all major SARS-CoV-2 variants is described in Nature, showing potent effect in macaques.
- 11 May
  - NASA reports on the continuous measurement, for the first time, of the density of material in interstellar space by the Voyager 1 space probe and the detection of interstellar sounds of vibrations of dense interstellar plasma.
  - A new record for the smallest single-chip system is achieved, occupying a total volume of less than 0.1 mm^{3}.
  - Scientists estimate, with higher resolution data, that land-use change has affected 17% of land in 1960–2019, or when considering multiple change events 32%, "around four times" previous estimates and investigate its drivers.
  - News reports inform about open source oxygen concentrators of which some are developed, locally manufactured – with prices below imported products – and used during a COVID-19 pandemic wave in India.
  - Scientists report that degrowth scenarios, where economic output either "declines" or declines in terms of contemporary economic metrics such as current GDP, have been neglected in considerations of 1.5 °C scenarios reported by the IPCC, finding that investigated degrowth scenarios "minimize many key risks for feasibility and sustainability compared to technology-driven pathways" with a core problem of such being feasibility in the context of contemporary political decision-making and rebound- and relocation-effects.
- 12 May
  - Scientists report to the United States Congress of the continuing threat of COVID-19 variants and COVID-19 escape mutations.
  - The first use of a brain-computer interface to decode neural signals for handwriting is demonstrated and shows a character output speed of more than double the previous record.
- 14 May
  - The China National Space Administration lands its Zhurong mission spacecraft at Utopia Planitia on Mars, making China the second nation to deliver a rover to the planet.
  - Archivists initiate a rescue mission to secure enduring access to humanity's largest public library of scientific articles, Sci-Hub, due to the site's increased legal troubles, using Web and BitTorrent technologies.
- 17 May – The largest, UK Biobank-based, genome-wide association study of mitochondrial DNA unveils 260 new associations with phenotypes including lifespan and disease risks for e.g. type 2 diabetes.
- 18 May – Google demonstrates a research project called LaMDA, an automatic language generation system designed to sustain a conversation with a person on any topic.
- 19 May – CRISPR gene editing is demonstrated to decrease LDL cholesterol in vivo in Macaca fascicularis by 60%.
- 20 May – A new record high resolution for atomic imaging is reported, with instrumental blurring reduced to less than 20 picometres.
- 21 May – A study finds that papers in leading journals with findings that can't be replicated tend to be cited more than reproducible science. Results that are published unreproducibly are more likely to be wrong, may slow progress and, according to an author, "a simple way to check how often studies have been repeated, and whether or not the original findings are confirmed" is needed.
- 24 May – Researchers partially restore eyesight of a patient with Retinitis pigmentosa using eye-injected viral vectors for genes encoding the light-sensing channelrhodopsin protein ChrimsonR found in glowing algae, and light stimulation of them via engineered goggles that transform visual information of the environment.
- 25 May
  - Scientists at Japan's RIKEN institute demonstrate a "dry transfer technique" enabling the precise positioning of optical-quality carbon nanotubes, without the need for a solvent.
  - The maximum lifespan for humans is placed at between 120 and 150, according to a longitudinal analysis of blood markers.
  - Scientists elaborate mechanics of memory consolidation during sleep which may allow purposely enabling or strengthening this reactivation of experiences and information.
- 26 May
  - Scientists develop a light-responsive days-lasting modulator of circadian rhythms of tissues via Ck1 inhibition which may be useful for chronobiology research and repair of organs that are "out of sync".
- 27 May – The U.S. Department of Energy launches Perlmutter, a next-generation supercomputer with four exaflops of AI performance, the world's fastest when measured by 16-bit and 32-bit mixed-precision math.
- 28 May
  - Biologists report the development of a new updated classification system for cell nuclei and find a way of transmuting one cell type into that of another.
  - China's EAST tokamak sets a new world record for superheated plasma, sustaining a temperature of 120 million °C for 101 seconds and a peak of 160 million °C for 20 seconds.
- 29 May – Medical scientists in Vietnam report a new, more contagious, form of the COVID-19 virus, that may be a mixture of the variants first detected in India and Britain.
- 30 May – The most comprehensive 3D map of the human brain – of a 1 mm^{3} sized millionth of a brain and requiring 1.4 petabytes of storage space – is published.

=== June ===
Science Summary podcast based on this section

- 2 June
  - NASA selects DAVINCI+ and VERITAS, two proposed spacecraft to study the atmosphere and surface of Venus, as the next missions in its Discovery Program.
  - A new study provides experimental evidence of asymmetric response of interfacial water to applied electric field by using a single layer graphene electrode and a novel surface-sensitive non-linear spectroscopy technique with implications for various water-related processes such as in water purification.
  - Scientists report that COVID-19 caused substantial changes to blood cells, sometimes persisting for months after hospital discharge, with implications for COVID-19 diagnostics and treatment.
- 3 June – Scientists report that due to decreases in power generation efficiency of wind farms downwind of offshore wind farms, cross-national limits and potentials for optimization need to be considered in strategic decision-making.

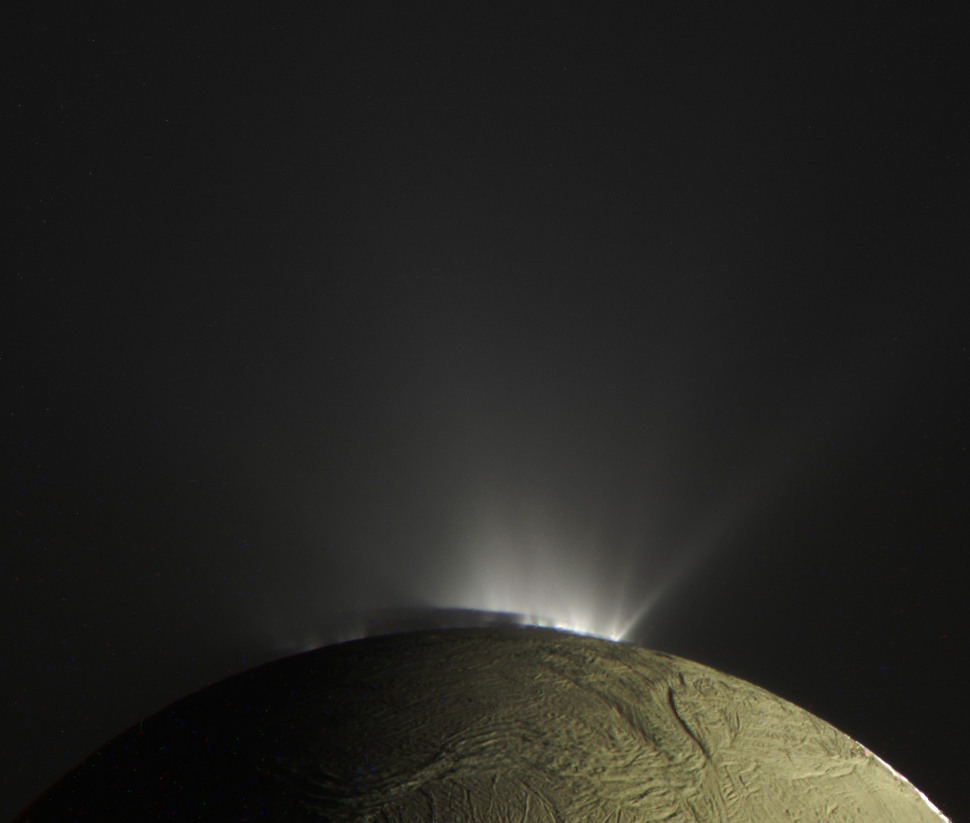
7 June: Astronomers report detecting substantial amounts of methane, a possible sign of microbial life, on Enceladus.

- 7 June
  - Astronomers report detecting substantial amounts of methane, a possible sign of microbial life, on Enceladus, a moon of the planet Saturn.
  - Biologists report the restoration of bdelloid rotifers after being frozen for ~24,000 years in the Siberian permafrost.
  - The Juno spacecraft performs its only flyby of Jupiter's moon Ganymede, the first flyby of the moon by any spacecraft in over 20 years.
- 8 June – Toshiba achieves quantum communications over optical fibres exceeding 600 km in length, a new world record distance.
- 9 June
  - Astronomers at the Canadian Hydrogen Intensity Mapping Experiment (CHIME) report the detection of over 500 Fast Radio Bursts from outer space.
  - Researchers from Google report a machine learning approach for microchip floorplanning that can outperform human designers.
  - Researchers report the development of quantum nonlinear light microscopy with higher sensitivity and beyond the biological photodamage limit.

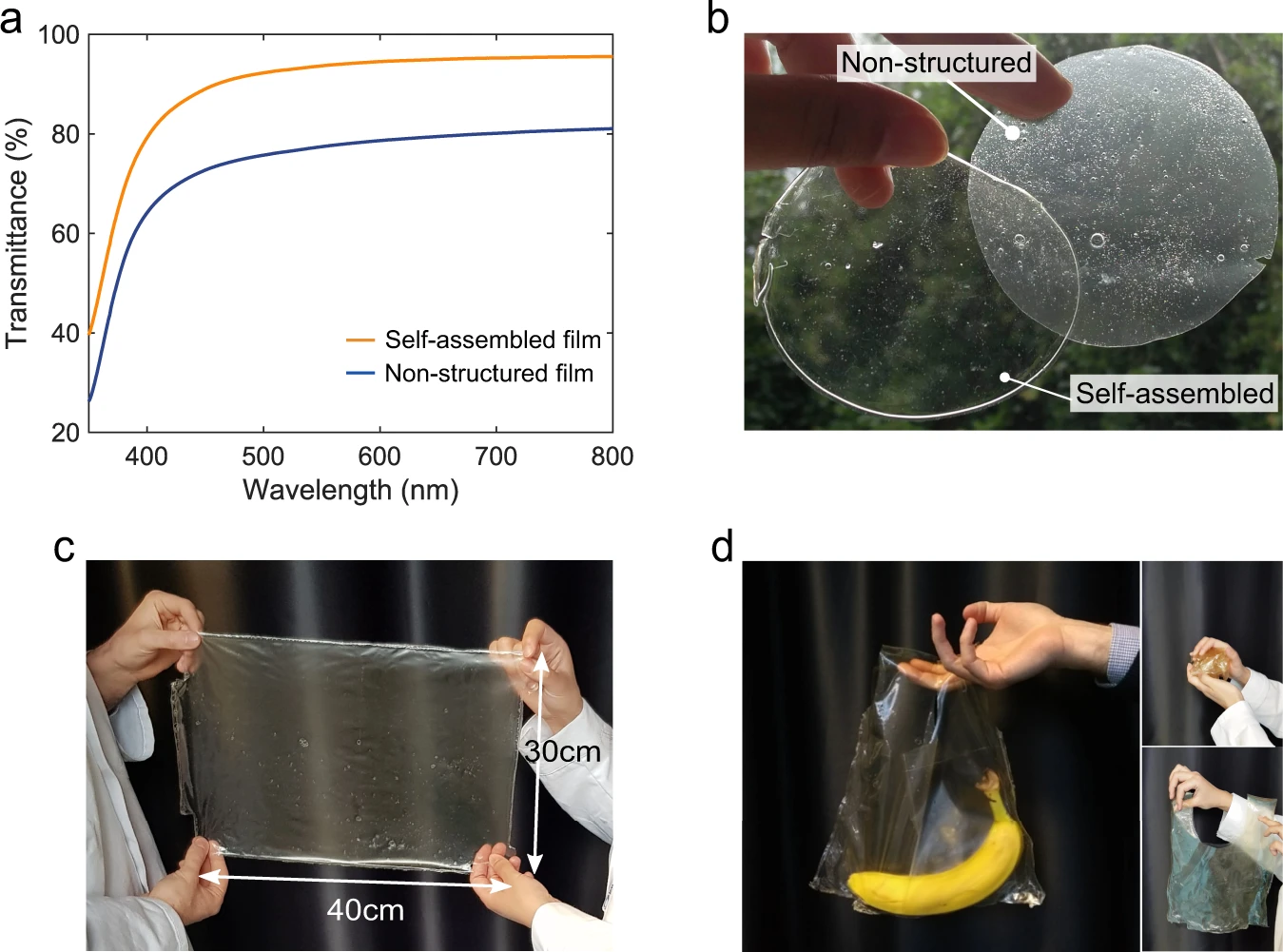
10 June: Researchers report the development of a plant proteins-based biodegradable packaging alternative to plastic molecularly similar to high-strength spider silk.

- 10 June
  - A trial of mosquitoes infected with Wolbachia bacteria results in a 77% reduction of dengue fever incidence and 86% reduction of hospitalisations in Yogyakarta, Indonesia.
  - A Venus-orbiting spacecraft, EnVision, is chosen by the European Space Agency as the fifth Medium-class mission in its Cosmic Vision plan, targeting a launch in the early 2030s.
  - Researchers report the development of the first quantum brain scanner which uses magnetic imaging and could become a novel whole-brain scanning approach.
  - Researchers report the development of a plant proteins-based biodegradable packaging alternative to plastic molecularly similar to high-strength spider silk.

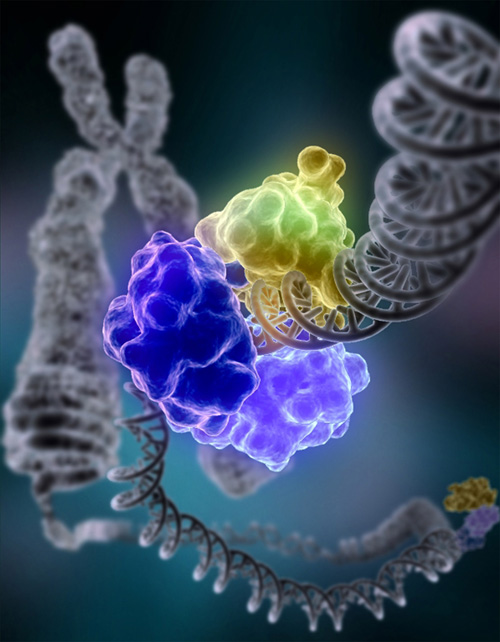
11 June: Biologists report that DNA polymerases, long thought to only transcribe DNA into DNA or RNA, can also write RNA segments into DNA.

- 11 June – Biologists report that DNA polymerases, long thought to only transcribe DNA into DNA or RNA, can also write RNA segments into DNA. Polθ was found to promote RNA-templated DNA repair, with large implications for many fields of biology.
- 14 June – Astronomers describe the largest known spinning structures in the Universe, consisting of "tendrils" of galaxies spanning hundreds of millions of light-years in length.

15 June: Scientists complement extensive evidence that cosmetics are widely designed with formulations and disposals that are harmful to human health and ecosystems, often containing PFAS.

- 15 June
  - Scientists report measurements of the rapidly increasing rate of the Earth's energy budget imbalance of global warming.
  - Scientists complement extensive evidence that cosmetics are widely designed with formulations and disposals that are harmful to human health and ecosystems, often containing PFAS.
- 16 June – Astronomers report that the Great Dimming of Betelgeuse, a red supergiant star, resulted from expulsion of a substantial amount of dust from the star, and not a sign of its destruction.
- 17 June
  - The first, three-person crew is sent to the Chinese space station Tiangong, which to date consists of the first and core module Tianhe.
  - Researchers present a quantum computing demonstrator that fits inside two 19-inch racks, the world's first quality standards-meeting compact quantum computer.
- 18 June – The existence of a "pulse" in Earth's geological activity, occurring approximately every 27.5 million years, is reported. The next pulse is due in about 20.5 million years.
- 19 June – A previously unknown comet, 2014 UN271, is reported by astronomers at the Dark Energy Survey. The object is estimated at between 100 and 200 km in size, potentially making it the largest comet ever discovered, and will pass as close as Saturn in January 2031.
- 23 June
  - Astronomers report the determination of 1,715 stars (with likely related exoplanetary systems) within 326 light-years (100 parsecs) that have a favorable positional vantage point—in relation to the Earth Transit Zone (ETZ)—of detecting Earth as an exoplanet transiting the Sun since the beginnings of human civilization (about 5,000 years ago).
  - A study finds that over half of a cohort of home-isolated young patients (16–30 y.) infected with COVID-19 still had symptoms after 6 months, including fatigue (21%).
- 24 June – Astronomers provide a new calculation for when the first stars formed, placing this event between 250 and 350 million years after the Big Bang.
- 25 June
  - Chinese archaeologists report that a skull discovered in Harbin in 1933 by a Manchukuo National Railway bridge, known as Homo longi or "Dragon Man", belongs to a previously undiscovered species of early humans closely related to Homo sapiens dating back 146,000 years ago.
  - The first comprehensive analysis of a Nesher Ramla Homo individual (120–140 kya) suggests an unrecognized group of hominins may have existed and, admixed with Neanderthals, was involved in the evolution of Middle Pleistocene Homo in Europe and East Asia.
  - Scientists report that natural immunity to COVID-19 via forms of prior infection combined with vaccination synergizes to extraordinarily large immune responses.
- 26 June – The first, small clinical trial of CRISPR gene editing in which a – lipid nanoparticle formulated – CRISPR (with mCas9) gene editing therapeutic is injected in vivo into bloodstream of humans concludes with promising results.
- 28 June
  - Scientists publish calculations of water activity levels in Venusian clouds based on data from space probes, concluding these to be two magnitudes too low at the examined places for a natural microbiotic explanation for potentially detected phosphine on Venus.
  - Researchers report the development of embedded biosensors for pathogenic signatures – such as of SARS-CoV-2 – that are wearable such as face masks.
- 29 June
  - The first detection of a neutron star–black hole collision is reported, with a second such event following 10 days later.
  - A study concludes that public services are associated with higher human need satisfaction and lower energy requirements while contemporary forms of economic growth are linked with the opposite. Authors find that the contemporary economic system is structurally misaligned with goals of sustainable development and that to date no nation can provide decent living standards at sustainable levels of energy and resource use. They provide analysis about factors in social provisioning and assess that improving beneficial provisioning-factors and -infrastructure would allow for sustainable forms of sufficient need satisfaction.
  - Scientists report that solar-energy-driven production of microbial foods from direct air capture substantially outperforms agricultural cultivation of staple crops in terms of land use.
- 30 June
  - The smallest and most massive white dwarf ever seen is reported. The star, named ZTF J1901+1458, has a diameter of just 4,300 km but is 1.35 times the mass of the Sun.
  - A study of the Laacher See volcano uses dendrochronology and radiocarbon dating to narrow the time of the eruption to 13,006 BP with an error of just 9 years, and shows that the onset of the Younger Dryas happened synchronously over the entire North Atlantic and Central European region.

== Deaths ==
- 1 April – Isamu Akasaki, Japanese engineer and physicist, Nobel Prize laureate (b. 1929)
- 4 April – Robert Mundell, Canadian economist (b. 1932)
- 4 June – Richard R. Ernst, Swiss physical chemist, Nobel Prize laureate (b. 1933)
- 6 June – Ei-ichi Negishi, Japanese chemist, Nobel Prize laureate (b. 1935)

== See also ==
- Category:Science events
- Category:Science timelines
- Impact of the COVID-19 pandemic on science and technology
- List of technologies
- List of emerging technologies
- List of years in science
