= Alternative natural materials =

Natural materials that are not as commonly used as building materials

Alternative natural materials are natural materials like rock or adobe that are not as commonly used as building materials such as wood or iron. Alternative natural materials have many practical uses in areas such as sustainable architecture and engineering. The main purpose of using such materials is to minimize the negative effects that built environments can have on the environment, while increasing the efficiency and adaptability of the structures.

== History ==
Alternative natural materials have existed for quite some time but often in very basic forms, or only as ingredients to a particular material. For example, earth used as a building material for walls of houses has existed for thousands of years. Much more recently, in the 1920s, the United States government promoted rammed earth as a fireproof construction method for building farmhouses. Another more common example is adobe. Adobe homes are prominent in the southwestern U.S. and several Spanish-speaking countries.

Straw bale construction is a more modern concept, but there exists evidence that straw was used to make homes in African prairies as far back as the Paleolithic times. Alternative natural materials, specifically their applications, have only recently made their way into more common use. The modern problems of global warming and climate change shifted more of a focus onto the materials and methods used to build our cityscape and homes. As environmentally conscious decisions became commonplace, the use of alternative natural materials instead of typical natural materials or man-made materials that rely heavily on natural resources became prominent.

== Structural materials ==
=== Rock ===
Rocks have two characteristics: good thermal mass and thermal insulation. The temperature in a house built from rock stays relatively constant, thus requiring less air conditioning and other cooling systems. Types of rocks that can be employed are reject stone (pieces of stone that are not able to be used for another task), limestone, and flagstone.

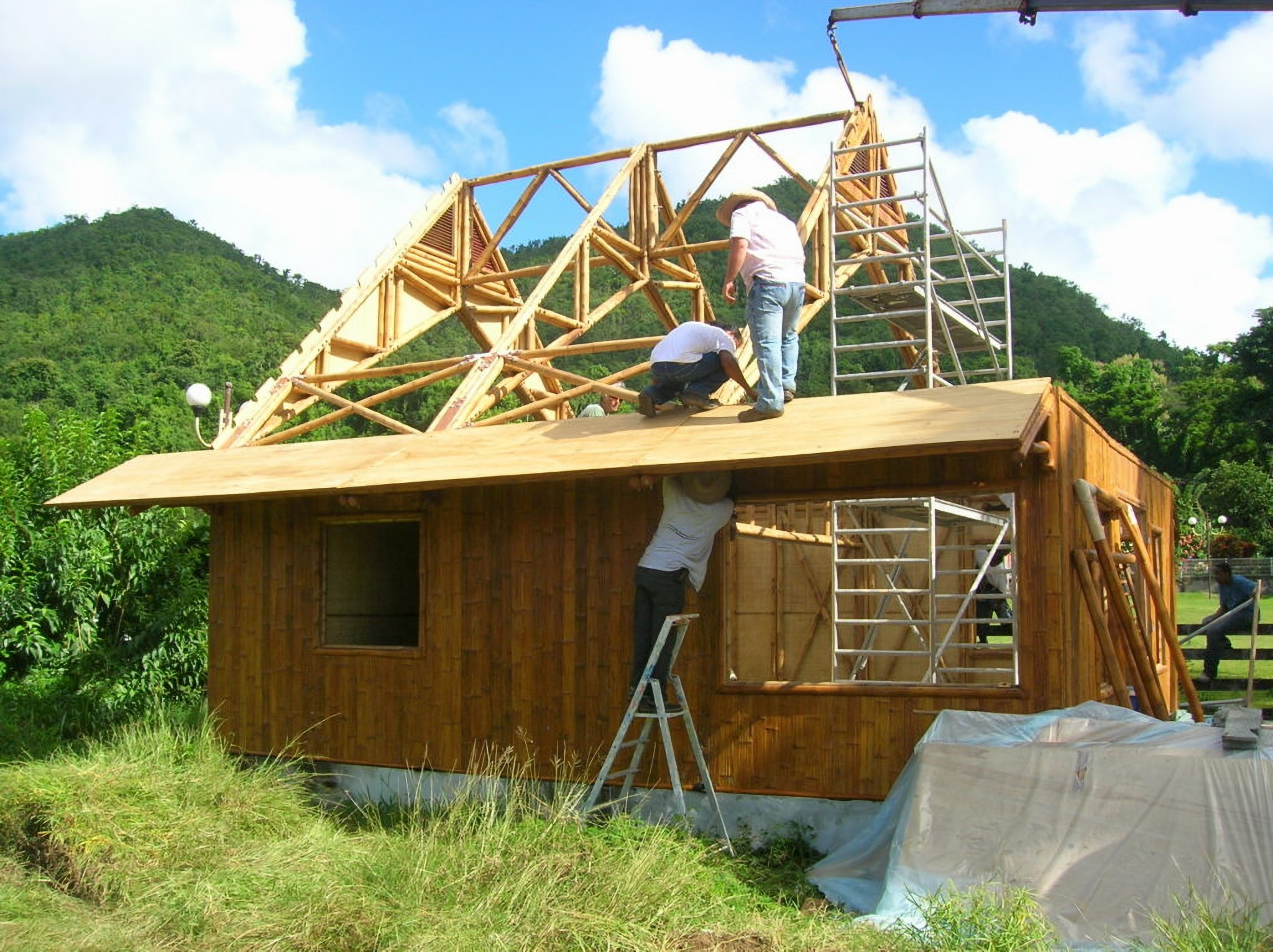
This picture depicts a cyclone- and earthquake-resistant home made completely of bamboo.

=== Bamboo ===
In Asian countries, bamboo is used for structures like bridges and homes. Bamboo is surprisingly strong and flexible and grows incredibly fast, making it an abundant material. Although it can be difficult to join corners together, bamboo's material strength makes up for the hardships that can be encountered while building with it.

=== Rammed earth ===
Rammed earth is a very abundant material that can be used in place of concrete and brick. Soil is packed tightly into wall molds where it is rammed together and hardened to form a durable wall packing made of nothing more than dirt, stones, and sticks. Rammed earth also provides thermal mass, resulting in energy savings. In addition, it is very weatherproof and durable enough that it was used in the Great Wall of China.

=== Earth-sheltered ===
Earth sheltering is a unique building technique in which buildings are completely constructed by some form of earth on at least one side, whether it be a grass roof, clay walls, or both. This unique system usually includes plenty of windows because of the difficulty involved with using too much electricity in such a house. This adds to the energy efficiency of the house by reducing lighting costs.

The Singapore School of Art, Media, and Design, has a roof made completely of sod (grass plus soil). This allows reduction of concrete and other conventional materials.

== Insulation materials ==
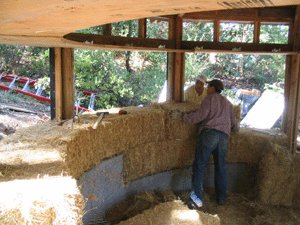
This article shows a straw bale wall under construction.

=== Straw ===
Straw bales can be used as a basis for walls instead of drywall. Straw provides excellent insulation and fire resistance in a traditional post-and-beam structure, where a wood frame supports the house. These straw walls are about 75% more energy efficient than standard drywall and because no oxygen can get through the walls, fire cannot spread and there is no chance of combustion.

=== Cordwood ===
Cordwood is a combination of small remnants of firewood and other lumber that would otherwise go to waste. These small blocks of wood can be put together easily to make a structure that, like stone, has insulation as well as thermal mass. Cordwood provides the rustic look of log cabins without the use of tons of lumber. An entire building can be constructed with just cordwood, or stones can be used to fill in the walls.

=== Cork ===
Cork is suitable as thermal insulation, as it is characterized by lightness, elasticity, impermeability, and fire resistance. In construction, cork can be applied in various construction elements like floors, walls, roofs, and lofts to reduce the need for heating or cooling and to enhance energy efficiency.

=== Adobe ===
Adobe is an age-old technique that is cheap, easy to obtain, and ideal for hot environments. A mixture of sand, clay, and water is poured into a mold and left in the sun to dry. When dried, it is exceptionally strong and heat-resistant. Adobe does not let much heat through to the inside of the structure, thus providing excellent insulation during the summer to reduce energy costs. Although this clay mixture provides excellent insulation from heat, it is not very waterproof and can be dangerous in earthquake prone areas due to its tendency to crack easily.

=== Sawdust ===
Sawdust can be combined with clay or cement mixtures and used for walls. Such walls are very sturdy and the method effectively recycles any trees needing excavation from the building area. Depending what type of sawdust is used (hardwood is best) the wood chips in the walls absorb moisture and help prevent cracking during freeze and thaw cycles. Sawdust may be combined with water and frozen to produce a material commonly known as pykrete, which is strong, and less prone to melting than regular ice.

=== Papercrete ===
Papercrete is a new material that serves as a good substitute for concrete. Papercrete is shredded paper, sand, and cement mixed together to form a very durable brick-like material. Buildings utilizing papercrete are well-insulated and resistant to termites and fire. Papercrete is very cheap as it usually only costs about $0.35 per square foot.

=== Hempcrete ===
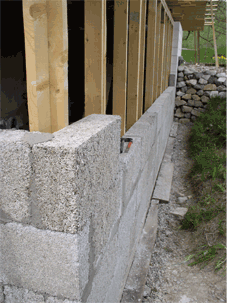
Construction block made from hempcrete

Hempcrete, also known as hemplime, is a sustainable biocomposite composed of hemp hurds mixed with lime, sand, or pozzolans material used in construction and insulation. The material offers advantages such as ease of use, insulation, and moisture regulation without the brittleness of traditional concrete. However, it exhibits low mechanical performance and is not suitable for load-bearing structures. It has good thermal and acoustic insulation properties, making it suitable for (non-load bearing) walls, finishing plaster, and insulation. It also acts as a carbon sink.

Hempcrete gained popularity in France since the 1990s, and is used in Canada for various construction purposes, such as indoor temperature control, prefabricated panels, and diverse insulation needs with different density mixtures.

=== Mycelium-based Composites ===
Mycelium-based composites consist of strains of inoculated mycelium grown from organic substrates like agricultural waste. The substrate is held together by strong hyphae bonds and forms a durable, malleable material. Since fungi grow rapidly and in various conditions, MBCs are relatively cheap to produce. They are flame-retardant, carbon-negative and biodegradable. As an insulator, they are not the highest performing, and are too lightweight to bear the loads other materials can. MBCs are still a relatively new idea and have much room for future innovations.

== See also ==
- Green building – Environmentally responsible construction principles
- Green building and wood
- Green roof – Roof covered with vegetation
- Hemp as a building material – Agricultural cannabis plant
- Natural building – Sustainable construction practice
- Sustainable architecture – Architecture designed to minimize environmental impact
- Sustainable landscaping – Low maintenance landscaping
- Sustainable landscape architecture – Category of sustainable design
- Sustainable gardening
