= Aneta Stodolna =

Polish physicist

Aneta Sylwia Stodolna is a Polish physicist known for being the first person to successfully use a quantum microscope to image electrons in a hydrogen atom.

Stodolna earned her Ph.D. from Radboud University in 2014.
