= Carbon negative architecture =

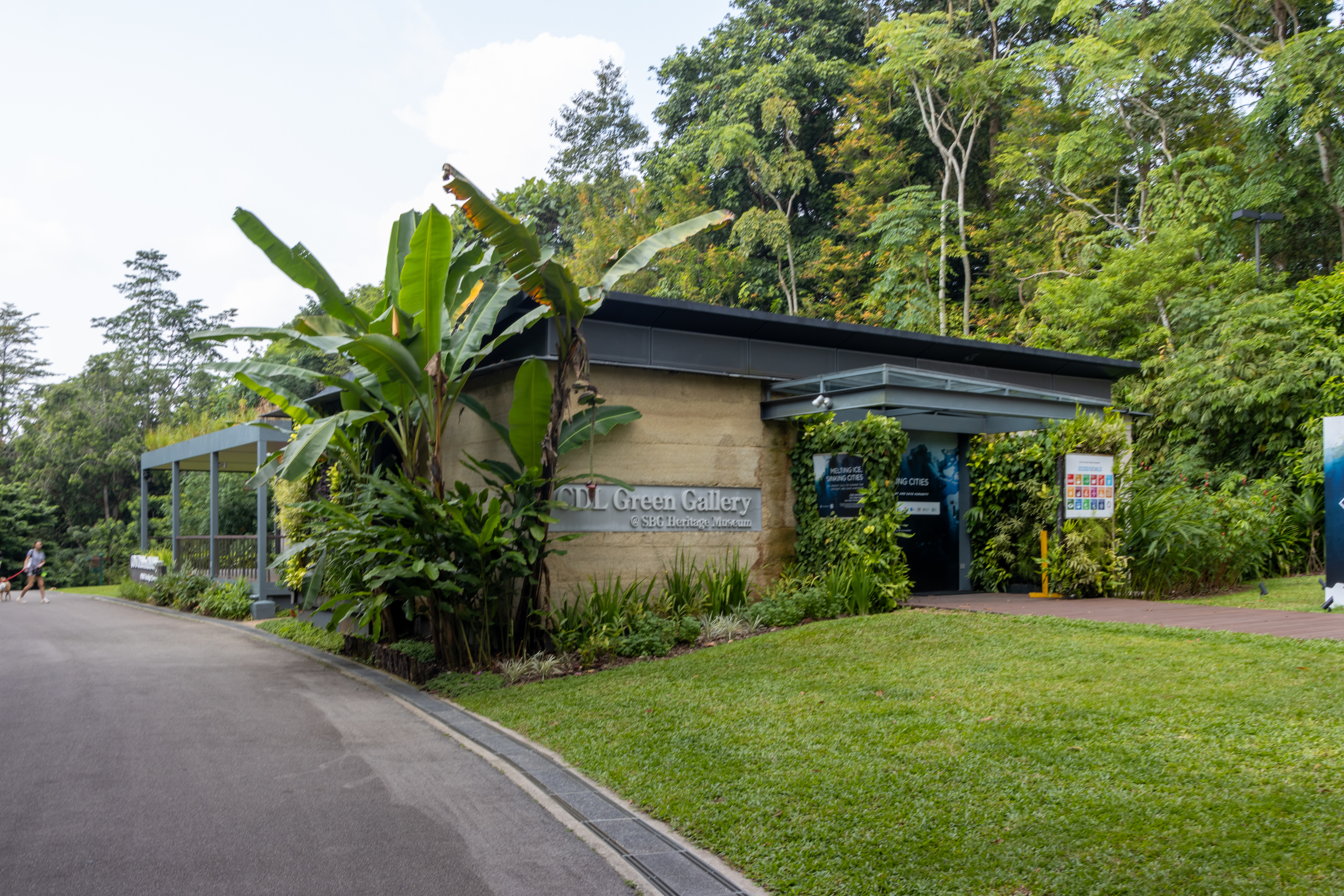
The CDL Green Gallery, a carbon negative building.

Carbon negative architecture is architecture whose construction, operation and eventual demolition results in more atmospheric carbon and greenhouse gases removed from the atmosphere than that which is emitted as consequence of the same. This is achieved by rigorous planning, regenerative architectural design and on-site carbon sequestration. Such buildings go beyond the carbon-neutral or net-zero approach, which simply means that buildings can still emit CO_{2} as long as the operators offset (or remove) those emissions from the atmosphere by the same amount in other places.

== Significance ==
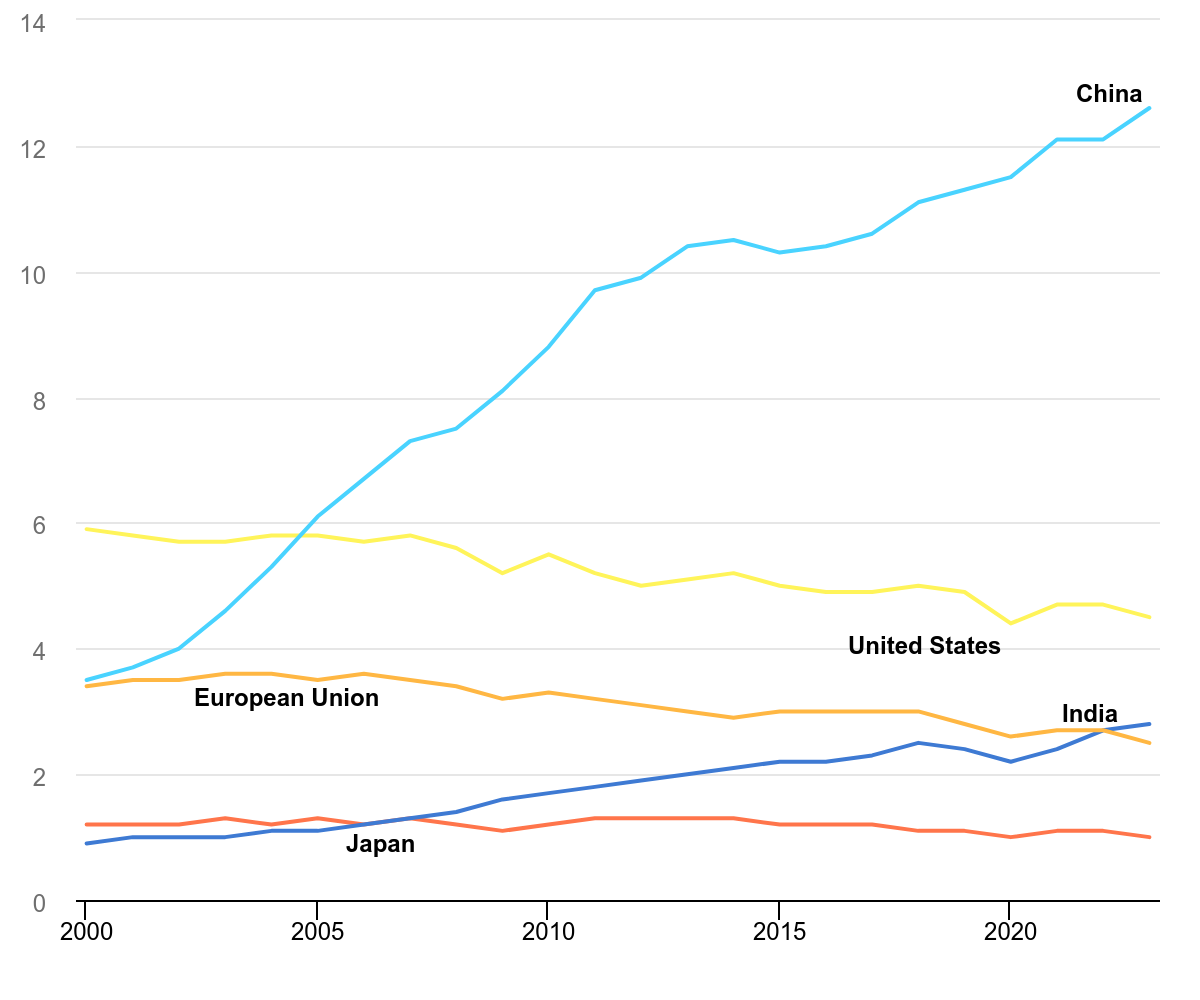
CO2 Total Emission by Region 2000-2023

The construction industry emits a large amount of carbon dioxide every year. Concrete, the most used building material globally, accounts for 5% of global annual CO_{2} emissions due its carbon-extensive production process. In 2023, global carbon emissions were 36.8 billion tons meaning the concrete construction industry alone emitted 1.84 billion tons of CO_{2} in 2023, more than most countries besides China, the European Union (as a collective), the United States and India.

== Features ==
Carbon negative buildings try to produce their own renewable energy while avoiding the use of fossil fuels during construction and in the materials used. Oftentimes, these materials can sequester carbon within themselves such as with novel building materials such as hempcrete and other bio-based construction materials, which store carbon within plants and turn said plant matter into building materials, allowing the building to act as a carbon sink. Additionally, by effectively controlling air flow and temperature inside the building through proper ventilation, insulation and breathability, energy efficiency is improved and the carbon output of the building is reduced as a result.

== Examples ==
Carbon negative architecture is still novel in terms of complete architecture projects; however, there are some completed projects that move toward and accomplish carbon neutral/carbon negative construction practices. The Unisphere building, located in Maryland and unrelated to the Unisphere statue in New York, worked towards this goal. The Unisphere is a private building project sponsored by the United Therapeutics Corporation. The building was completed in 2018, and had a carbon neutral building process by using electricity generated from solar panels on site as well as designing the building for low energy consumption. The building features basement operations which help to naturally cool the building using the earth.

Another example of carbon negative architecture is the Tecla house, a 3D printed small house, produced with a slurry composed primarily of clay alongside other materials such as pieces of rice plants, silt & sand and hydraulic lime. Additionally, wooden support beams uphold the structure of the building. The Tecla house is a prototype currently undergoing more testing.

== See also ==
- Greenhouse gas
- Carbon sequestration
- Net-zero emissions
- Fossil fuel
- Hempcrete
- Carbon sink
- Tecla house
- Passive house
- Green infrastructure
- Sustainable architecture
- Carbon dioxide removal
