= Quantum microscopy =

Quantum microscopy allows microscopic properties of matter and quantum particles to be measured and imaged. Various types of microscopy use quantum principles. The first microscope to do so was the scanning tunneling microscope, which paved the way for development of the photoionization microscope and the quantum entanglement microscope.

== Scanning tunneling ==
The scanning tunneling microscope (STM) uses the concept of quantum tunneling to directly image atoms. A STM can be used to study the three-dimensional structure of a sample, by scanning the surface with a sharp, metal, conductive tip close to the sample. Such an environment is conducive to quantum tunneling: a quantum mechanical effect that occurs when electrons move through a barrier due to their wave-like properties. Tunneling depends on the thickness of the barrier; the Schrödinger equation gives the probability that a particle will be detected on the far side and, for a sufficiently thin barrier, predicts some electrons will cross it. This creates a current across the tunnel. The number of electrons that tunnel is dependent on the thickness of the barrier, therefore the current through the barrier also depends on this thickness. The distance between the tip and the sample affects the current measured by the tip. The tip is formed by a single atom that slowly moves across the surface at a distance of one atomic diameter. By observing the current, the distance can be kept fairly constant, allowing the tip to move up and down according to the structure of the sample.

The STM works best with conducting materials in order to create a current. However, since its creation, various implementations allow for a larger variety of samples, such as spin polarized scanning tunneling microscopy (SPSTM), and atomic force microscopy (AFM).

== Photoionization ==
The wave function is central to quantum mechanics. It contains the maximum information that can be known about a single particle's quantum state. The square of the wave function is the probability of a particle's location at any given moment. Direct imaging of a wave function used to be considered only a gedanken experiment, but became routine. An image of an atom's exact position or the movement of its electrons is almost impossible to measure because any direct observation of an atom disturbs its quantum coherence. As such, observing an atom's wave function and getting an image of its full quantum state requires many measurements to be made, which are then statistically averaged. The photoionization microscope directly visualizes atomic structure and quantum states.

A photoionization microscope employs photoionization, along with quantum properties and principles, to measure atomic properties. The principle is to study the spatial distribution of electrons ejected from an atom in a situation in which the De Broglie wavelength becomes large enough to be observed on a macroscopic scale. An atom in an electric field is ionized by a focused laser. The electron is drawn toward a position-sensitive detector, and the current is measured as a function of position. The application of an electric field during photoionization allows confining the electron flux along one dimension.

Multiple classical paths lead from the atom to any point in the classically allowed region on the detector, and waves travelling along these paths produce an interference pattern. An infinite set of trajectory families lead to a complicated interference pattern on the detector. As such, photoionization microscopy relies on the existence of interference between various trajectories by which the electron moves from the atom to the plane of observation, for example, of a hydrogen atom in parallel electric and magnetic fields.

=== History and development ===
The idea stemmed from an experiment proposed by Demkov and colleagues in the early 1980s. The researchers suggested that electron waves could be imaged when interacting with a static electric field as long as the de Broglie Wavelength of these electrons was large enough. It was not until 1996 that anything resembling these ideas bore fruit. In 1996 a team of French researchers developed the first photodetachment microscope. It allowed for direct observation of the oscillatory structure of a wave function. Photodetachment is the removal of electrons from an atom using interactions with photons or other particles. Photodetachment microscopy made it possible to image the spatial distribution of the ejected electron. The microscope developed in 1996 was the first to image photodetachment rings of a negative Bromine ion. These images revealed interference between two electron waves on their way to the detector.

The first attempts to use photoionization microscopy were performed on atoms of Xenon by a team of Dutch researchers in 2001. The differences between direct and indirect ionization create different trajectories for the outbound electron. Direct ionization corresponds to electrons ejected down-field towards the bottleneck in the Coulomb + dc electric field potential, whereas indirect ionization corresponds to electrons ejected away from the bottleneck in the Coulomb + dc electric field and only ionize upon further Coulomb interactions. These trajectories produce a distinct pattern that can be detected by a two-dimensional flux detector and subsequently imaged. The images exhibit an outer ring that correspond to the indirect ionization process and an inner ring, which correspond to the direct ionization process. This oscillatory pattern can be interpreted as interference among the trajectories of the electrons moving from the atom to the detector.

The next group to attempt photoionization microscopy used the excitation of Lithium atoms in the presence of a static electric field. This experiment was the first to reveal evidence of quasibound states. A quasibound state is a "state having a connectedness to true bound state through the variation of some physical parameter". This was done by photoionizing the Lithium atoms in the presence of a ≈1 kV/cm static electric field. This experiment was an important precursor to the imaging of the hydrogen wave function because, contrary to the experiments done with Xenon, Lithium wave function microscopy images are sensitive to the presence of resonances. Therefore, the quasibound states were directly revealed.

In 2013, Aneta Stodolna and colleagues imaged the hydrogen atom's wave function by measuring an interference pattern on a 2D detector. The electrons are excited to their Rydberg state. In this state, the electron orbital is far from the centre nucleus. The Rydberg electron is in a dc field, which causes it to be above the classical ionization threshold, but below the field-free ionization energy. The electron wave ends up producing an interference pattern because the portion of the wave directed towards the 2D detector interferes with the portion directed away from the detector. This interference pattern shows a number of nodes that is consistent with the nodal structure of the Hydrogen atom orbital

=== Future directions ===
The same team of researchers that imaged the hydrogen electron's wave function are attempting to image helium. They report considerable differences, since helium has two electrons, which may enable them to 'see' entanglement.

== Quantum entanglement ==
Quantum metrology makes precise measurements that cannot be achieved classically. Typically, entanglement of N particles is used to measure a phase with precision ∆φ = 1/N, called the Heisenberg limit. This exceeds the ∆φ = 1/√N precision limit possible with N non-entangled particles, called the standard quantum limit (SQL). The signal-to-noise ratio (SNR) for a given light intensity is limited by SQL, which is critical for measurements where the probe light intensity is limited in order to avoid damaging the sample. The SQL can be tackled using entangled particles.

The microscope first imaged a relief pattern of a glass plate. In one test, the pattern was 17 nanometers higher than the plate.

Quantum entanglement microscopes are a form of confocal-type differential interference contrast microscope. Entangled photon pairs and more generally, NOON states are the illumination source. Two beams of photons are beamed at adjacent spots on a flat sample. The interference pattern of the beams are measured after they are reflected. When the two beams hit the flat surface, they both travel the same length and produce a corresponding interference pattern. This interference pattern changes when the beams hit regions of different heights. The patterns can be resolved by analysing the interference pattern and phase difference. A standard optical microscope would be unlikely to detect something so small. The image is precise when measured with entangled photons, as each entangled photon gives information about the other. Therefore, they provide more information than independent photons, creating sharper images.

=== Future directions ===
Entanglement-enhancement principles can be used to improve the image. Researchers are thereby able to overcome the Rayleigh criterion. This is ideal for studying biological tissues and opaque materials. However, the light intensity must be lowered to avoid damaging the sample.

Entangled-photon microscopy can avoid the phototoxicity and photobleaching that comes with two-photon scanning fluorescence microscopy. In addition, since the interaction region within entangled microscopy is controlled by two beams, image site selection is flexible, which provides enhanced axial and lateral resolution

In addition to biological tissues, high-precision optical phase measurements have applications such as gravitational wave detection, measurement of materials properties, as well as medical and biological sensing.

== Biological quantum light microscopes ==
Researchers have developed quantum light microscopes based on squeezed states of light. Squeezed states of light have noise characteristics that are reduced beneath the shot noise level in one quadrature (such as amplitude or phase) at the expense of increased noise in the orthogonal quadrature. This reduced noise can be used to improve signal-to-noise ratio. Squeezed states have been shown to allow a signal-to-noise ratio improvement of as much as a factor of thirty.

The first biological quantum light microscope used squeezed light in an optical tweezer to probe the interior of a living yeast cell. In experiments it was shown that squeezed light allowed more precise tracking of lipid granules that naturally occur within the cell, and that this provided a more accurate measurement of the local viscosity of the cell. Viscosity is an important property of cells that is connected to their health, structural properties and local function. Later, the same microscope was employed as a photonic force microscope, tracking a granule as it diffused spatially. This allowed quantum enhanced resolution to be demonstrated, and for this to be achieved in a far-sub-diffraction limited microscope.

Squeezed light has also been used to improve nonlinear microscopy. Nonlinear microscopes use intense laser illumination, close to the levels at which biological damage can occur. This damage is a key barrier to improving their performance, preventing the intensity from being increased and therefore putting a hard limit on SNR. By using squeezed light in such a microscope, researchers have shown that this limit can be broken - that SNR beyond that achievable beneath photo-damage limits of regular microscopy can be achieved.

== Quantum enhanced fluorescence super-resolution ==
In a fluorescence microscope, images of objects that contain fluorescent particles are recorded. Each such particle can emit not more than one photon at a time, a quantum-mechanical effect known as photon antibunching. Recording anti-bunching in a fluorescence image provides additional information that can be used to enhance the microscope's resolution beyond the diffraction limit, and was demonstrated for several types of fluorescent particles.

Intuitively, antibunching can be thought of as detection of 'missing' events of two photons emitted from every particle that cannot simultaneously emit two photons. It is therefore used to produce an image that would have been produced using photons with half the wavelength of the detected photons. By detecting N-photon events, the resolution can be improved by up to a factor of N over the diffraction limit.

In conventional fluorescence microscopes, antibunching information is ignored, as simultaneous detection of multiple photon emission requires temporal resolution higher than that of most commonly available cameras. However, improved detector technology enabled demonstrations of quantum enhanced super-resolution using fast detector arrays, such as single-photon avalanche diode arrays.

== Quantum enhanced Raman microscopy ==
Quantum correlations offer an SNR beyond the photo-damage limit (the amount of energy that can be delivered without damage to the sample) of conventional microscopy. A coherent Raman microscope offers sub-wavelength resolution and incorporates bright quantum correlated illumination. Molecular bonds within a cell can be imaged with a 35 per cent improved SNR compared with conventional microscopy, corresponding to a 14% concentration sensitivity improvement.
