= Environmental impact of concrete =

The environmental impact of concrete, its manufacture, and its applications, are complex, driven in part by direct impacts of construction and infrastructure, as well as by CO_{2} emissions; between 4-8% of total global CO_{2} emissions come from concrete. Many depend on circumstances. A decisive component is cement, which has its own environmental and social impacts and contributes largely to those of concrete. The cement industry is one of the main producers of carbon dioxide, a greenhouse gas. Portland cement is the dominant type of cement. The main source of its emissions is not fuel burning, but the chemical process called calcination.

Concrete is used to create hard surfaces which contribute to surface runoff that may cause soil erosion, water pollution and flooding. Conversely, concrete is one of the most powerful tools for flood control, by means of damming, diversion, and deflection of flood waters, mud flows, and the like. Light-colored concrete can reduce the urban heat island effect, due to its higher albedo. However, original vegetation results in even greater benefit. Concrete dust released by building demolition and natural disasters can be a major source of dangerous air pollution. The presence of some substances in concrete, including useful and unwanted additives, can cause health concerns due to toxicity and (usually naturally occurring) radioactivity. Wet concrete is highly alkaline and should always be handled with proper protective equipment. Concrete recycling is increasing in response to improved environmental awareness, legislation, and economic considerations. Conversely, the use of concrete mitigates the use of alternative building materials such as wood, which is a natural form of carbon sequestering.

== Toxic and radioactive contamination ==
Substantial amount of construction dust emitted and rising up from a building under rehabilitation in Hong Kong.

The presence of some substances in concrete, including useful and unwanted additives, can cause health concerns. Natural radioactive elements (K, U, Th, and Rn) can be present in various concentration in concrete dwellings, depending on the source of the raw materials used. For example, some stones naturally emit Radon, and Uranium was once common in mine refuse. Toxic substances may also be unintentionally used as the result of contamination from a nuclear accident. Dust from rubble or broken concrete upon demolition or crumbling may cause serious health concerns depending also on what had been incorporated in the concrete. However, embedding harmful materials in concrete is not always dangerous and may in fact be beneficial. In some cases, incorporating certain compounds such as metals in the hydration process of cement immobilizes them in a harmless state and prevents them from being released freely elsewhere.

== Carbon dioxide emissions and climate change ==
The cement industry is one of the two largest producers of carbon dioxide (CO_{2}), creating up to 8% of worldwide man-made emissions of this gas, of which 50% is from the chemical process and 40% from burning fuel. The CO_{2} produced for the manufacture of structural concrete (using ~14% cement) is estimated at 410 kg/m^{3} (~180 kg/tonne @ density of 2.3 g/cm^{3}) (reduced to 290 kg/m^{3} with 30% fly ash replacement of cement). The CO_{2} emission from the concrete production is directly proportional to the cement content used in the concrete mix; 900 kg of CO_{2} are emitted for the fabrication of every ton of cement, accounting for 88% of the emissions associated with the average concrete mix. Cement manufacture contributes greenhouse gases both directly through the production of carbon dioxide when calcium carbonate is thermally decomposed, producing lime and carbon dioxide, and also through the use of energy, particularly from the combustion of fossil fuels.

One area of the concrete life cycle worth noting is its very low embodied energy per unit mass. This is primarily because the materials used in concrete construction, such as aggregates, pozzolans, and water, are relatively plentiful and can often be drawn from local sources. This means that transportation only accounts for 7% of the embodied energy of concrete, while cement production accounts for 70%. Concrete has a total embodied energy of 1.69 GJ/tonne, lower per unit mass than most common building materials besides wood. However, concrete structures often have high masses, so this comparison is not always directly relevant to decision making. Additionally, this value is based only on mix proportions of up to 20% fly ash. It is estimated that a 1% replacement of cement with fly ash represents a 0.7% reduction in energy consumption. With some proposed mixes containing as much as 80% fly ash, this could represent a considerable energy saving.

A 2022 report from the Boston Consulting Group found that investments in greener forms of cement would lead to greater greenhouse gas reductions, per dollar, than investments in many other green technologies—though investments in plant-based meat alternatives would reap considerably greater reductions than even this.

== Mitigation ==
=== Design improvements ===
There is a growing interest in reducing carbon emissions related to concrete from both the academic and industrial sectors, especially with the possibility of future carbon tax implementation. Several approaches to reducing emissions have been suggested.

==== Cement production and use ====
Carbon emissions from cement manufacture are high because of the high temperatures required to produce clinker. A major component of clinker is alite (Ca_{3}SiO_{5}). Alite is produced at 1,500 °C in the clinker-forming process. Some research suggests that alite can be replaced by a different mineral, such as belite (Ca_{2}SiO_{4}). Belite is also a mineral already used in concrete. It has a roasting temperature of 1,200 °C. Furthermore, belite actually cures to give stronger concrete. However, belite takes on the order of days or months to set completely, which leaves concrete weak for longer. Belite takes more energy to grind, which may make its full life of impact similar to or even higher than alite.

Another approach has been the partial replacement of conventional clinker with such alternatives as fly ash, bottom ash, and slag, all of which are by-products of other industries that would otherwise end up in landfills. Fly ash and bottom ash come from thermoelectric power plants, while slag is a waste from blast furnaces in the ironworks industry. These materials are slowly gaining popularity as additives, especially since they can potentially increase strength, decrease density, and prolong durability of concrete.

One obstacle to wider implementation of fly ash and slag may be largely due to the risk of construction with new technology that has not been exposed to long field testing. Until a carbon tax is implemented, companies are unwilling to take the chance with new concrete mix recipes even if this reduces carbon emissions. However, there are some examples of "green" concrete and its implementation. One instance is a concrete company called Ceratech that has started manufacturing concrete with 95% fly ash and 5% liquid additives. Another is the I-35W Saint Anthony Falls Bridge, which was constructed with a novel mixture of concrete that included different compositions of Portland cement, fly ash, and slag depending on the portion of the bridge and its material properties requirements. Several startup companies are developing and testing alternative cement production methods. Sublime of Somerville, Massachusetts uses a no-kiln electrochemical process, and Fortera captures carbon dioxide from conventional plants to make a new kind of cement. Blue Planet of Los Gatos, California captures emitted carbon dioxide to produce synthetic concrete. CarbonCure Technologies of Halifax, Nova Scotia has retrofitted its carbon mineralization systems at hundreds of concrete plants around the world, injecting and permanently storing carbon dioxide in concrete as it is being mixed.

Furthermore, the production of concrete requires large amounts of water, and global production accounts for almost a tenth of worldwide industrial water use. This amounts to 1.7 percent of total global water withdrawal. A study that appeared in Nature Sustainability in 2018 predicts that concrete production will in the future increase pressure on water resources in regions susceptible to drought conditions, writing, "In 2050, 75% of the water demand for concrete production will likely occur in regions that are expected to experience water stress".

==== Carbon concrete ====
Carbonatation, sometimes called carbonation, is the formation of calcium carbonate (CaCO_{3}) by chemical reaction, which, if used in concrete, can sequester carbon dioxide. The speed of carbonation depends primarily on the porosity of the concrete and its moisture content. Carbonation in concrete pores happens only at a relative humidity (RH) of 40-90%—when RH is higher than 90%, carbon dioxide cannot enter the concrete pores, and when RH is lower than 40%, CO_{2} cannot be dissolved in water.

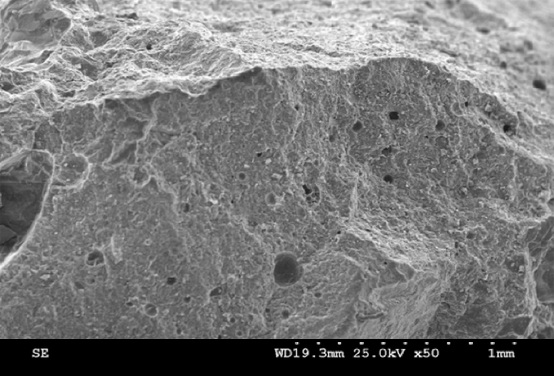
Pore structures in fresh concrete and air entrained in concrete

Concrete can be carbonated by two main methods: weathering carbonation and early age carbonation.

Weathering carbonation occurs in concrete when calcium compounds react with carbon dioxide (CO_{2}) from the atmosphere and water (H_{2}O) in the concrete pores. The reaction is as follows. First, through chemical weathering, CO_{2} reacts with water in the concrete pores to form carbonic acid:

CO_{2} + H_{2}O ⇌ H_{2}CO_{3}

Carbonic acid then reacts with calcium hydroxide to form calcium carbonate and water:

Ca(OH)_{2} + H_{2}CO_{3} ⇌ CaCO_{3} + 2 H_{2}O

Once the calcium hydroxide (Ca(OH)_{2}) has sufficiently carbonated, the main component of cement, calcium silicate hydrate gel (C-S-H), can be decalcified, i.e., liberated calcium oxide (CaO>) can carbonate:

H_{2}CO_{3} + CaO ⇌ CaCO_{3} + H_{2}O

A 2024 study found that the climate benefits of natural cement carbonation can be overstated because cement absorbs carbon dioxide slowly over time. It also found that crushing concrete after demolition produces emissions that could nearly cancel out the carbon dioxide absorbed during the demolition stage.

Early age carbonation is when CO_{2} is introduced to the early stages of fresh premix concrete or upon initial curing, which can occur both naturally through exposure or be artificially accelerated by augmenting a direct intake of CO_{2}. Gaseous carbon dioxide is converted to solid carbonates and can be permanently stored in concrete. The reactions of CO_{2} and calcium silicate hydrate (C-S-H) in cement was described in 1974 in cement chemist notation (CCN) as:

C_{3}S + 3 CO_{2} + H_{2}O → CSH + 3 CaCO_{3} + 347 kJ/mol
C_{2}S + 2 CO_{2} + H_{2}O → CSH + 2 CaCO_{3} + 184 kJ/mol

A Canadian company patented and commercialized a novel technology that uses early age carbonation to sequester CO_{2}. This is achieved by directly injecting recycled liquid carbon dioxide from third-party industrial emitters into the concrete wet-mix stage during the manufacturing process. CO_{2} is then chemically mineralized, sequestering the greenhouse gas pollutant in concrete infrastructure, buildings, roads, etc. for long periods of time.

In a study published in the Journal of Cleaner Production, the authors created a model showing that sequestered CO_{2} improved the compressive strength of concrete while reducing CO_{2} emissions, thus allowing for a cement loading reduction while also having a "4.6% reduction in the carbon footprint".

Another proposed method of capturing emissions is to absorb CO_{2} in the curing process through the use of an admixture—specifically, a dicalcium silicate in 𝛾 phase—as the concrete cures. The use of fly ash or another suitable substitute could theoretically bring CO_{2} emissions below 0 kg/m^{3}, compared to Portland cement concrete emissions of 400 kg/m^{3}. The most effective method of production of this concrete would use the exhaust gas of a power plant, where an isolated chamber could control temperature and humidity.

In August 2019, reduced CO_{2} cement was announced which "reduces the overall carbon footprint in precast concrete by 70%". The base of the cement is primarily wollastonite (CaSiO_{3}) and rankinite (3CaO·2SiO_{2}), in contrast to traditional Portland cement, based on alite 3CaO·SiO_{2}) and belite (2CaO·SiO_{2}). The patented process of reduced-emissions concrete manufacture begins with the bonding of particles through liquid phase sintering, also referred to as reactive hydrothermal liquid-phase densification (rHLPD). A solution of water and CO_{2} penetrates the particles, reacting in ambient conditions to form a bond which creates reduced-lime, non-hydraulic calcium silicate cement (CSC). The difference between traditional Portland concrete and these carbonated calcium silicate concrete (CSC-C) lies in the final curing process reaction between a water-CO_{2} solution and a family of calcium-silicate. According to a study of one reduced-emissions cement, called Solidia, "CSC-C curing is a mildly exothermic reaction in which the low-lime calcium silicates in the CSC react with CO_{2} in the presence of water to produce calcite (CaCO_{3}) and silica (SiO_{2}) as follows:

CaSiO_{3} + CO_{2} → CaCO_{3} + SiO_{2}

However, as early age carbonation methods have gained recognition due to their substantial carbon sequestration proficiencies, some authors have argued that the effect of early-age carbonation curing may succumb to weathering carbonation later on. For example, a 2020 article writes, "Experimental results suggest that early-age carbonated concretes with high w/c ratios (>0.65) are more likely to be affected by weathering carbonation". The article cautions that this may weaken its strength abilities in the corrosion stages during life service.

Italian company Italcementi designed a kind of cement that is supposedly alleviating air pollution by breaking down pollutants that come in contact with the concrete, through the use of titanium dioxide absorbing ultraviolet light. Some environmental experts nevertheless remain skeptical and wonder if the special material can "eat" enough pollutants to make it financially viable. Jubilee Church in Rome is built from this kind of concrete.

Another aspect to consider in carbon concrete is surface scaling due to cold climatic conditions and exposure to de-icing salt and freeze-thaw cycles (frost weathering). Concrete produced by carbonation curing also shows superior performance when subject to physical degradations, e.g., freeze-thaw damage, particularly due to a pore densification effect enabled by the precipitation of carbonation products

The vast majority of CO_{2} emissions from concrete come from cement manufacturing. Therefore, methods to reduce cement materials in each concrete mix are the only known methods to reduce the emissions.

==== Photocatalysis to reduce smog ====
Titanium dioxide (TiO_{2}), a semiconductor material shown to exhibit photocatalytic behavior, has been incorporated into an experimental concrete. The resulting material mitigates NOx pollution.

==== Embedded solar cells ====
Dye-sensitized solar cells embedded in concrete has been proposed as a method of reducing the carbon and energy footprints of buildings. The usage of embedded solar cells allows for on-site energy generation, which when coupled with batteries, would provide constant power throughout the day. The top layer of the concrete would be a thin layer of dye-sensitized solar cells. Dye-sensitized solar cells are particularly attractive due to its ease of mass production, either via roll-printing or painting, and a reasonably high efficiency of 10%. One example of the commercialization of this concept is the German company Discrete, which produces a dye-sensitized solar cell embedded concrete product. Their process uses a spray-coating method to apply organic dyes that generate electricity onto concrete.

==== Energy storage ====
Energy storage has become an important consideration for many renewable energy generation methods, especially for popular methods such as solar or wind energy, both of which are intermittent energy producers that require storage for constant use. Currently, 96% of the world’s energy storage comes from pumped hydro, which uses excess generated electricity to pump water up a dam and then allowed to fall and turn turbines that produce electricity when the demand exceeds generation. The problem with pumped hydro, however, is that the setup requires specific geographies that can be difficult to find. A similar concept that uses cement instead of water has been realized by Energy Vault, a Swiss startup. They created a setup that uses an electric crane surrounded by stacks of 35-ton concrete blocks, which can be produced using waste products, to store energy by using excess energy generation to power the crane to lift and stack the concrete blocks. When energy is needed, the blocks are allowed to fall and the rotated motor would send energy back to the grid. The setup would have a storage capacity of 25-80 MWh.

==== Other improvements ====
"Smart" concretes use electrical and mechanical signals to respond to changes in loading conditions. One variety uses carbon fiber reinforcement which provides an electrical response that can be used to measure strain. This allows for monitoring the structural integrity of the concrete without installing sensors.

The road construction and maintenance industry consumes tons of carbon-intensive concrete every day to secure road-side and urban infrastructure. As populations grow this infrastructure is becoming increasingly vulnerable to impact from vehicles, creating an ever increasing cycle of damage and waste and ever increasing consumption of concrete for repairs (roadworks are now seen around our cities on almost a daily basis). A major development in the infrastructure industry involves the use of recycled petroleum waste to protect the concrete from damage and enable infrastructure to become dynamic, able to be easily maintained and updated without disturbance to the existing foundations. This preserves the foundations for the entire lifespan of a development.

Another area of concrete research involves the creation of certain “waterless” concretes for use in extraplanetary colonization. Most commonly, these concretes use sulfur to act as a non-reactive binder, allowing for construction of concrete structures in environments with no or very little water. These concretes are in many ways indistinguishable from normal hydraulic concrete: they have similar densities, can be used with currently existing metal reinforcement, and they actually gain strength faster than normal concrete This application has yet to be explored on Earth, but with concrete production representing as much as two-thirds of the total energy usage of some developing countries, any improvement is worth considering.

=== Changes in use ===
Concrete is one of the world's oldest man-made building materials. Over the years, significant environmental limitations have been placed on the creation and use of concrete due to its carbon footprint. Manufacturers responded to these limitations by altering concrete's production processes, and recycling old concrete rubble to use as aggregate in new concrete mixtures to reduce these emissions. Concrete has immersed from natural resources into man-made processes; evidence of the use of concrete dates back over 8,000 years ago.

=== Alternatives to concrete ===
Several forms of "green concrete" have been investigated. Some are produced from waste materials. "Ashcrete" is a material made from a mix of lime and water. Black furnace slag is also a strong alternative made from molten iron slag into water, along with Micro Silica, Papercrete, composite cement, and post-consumer glass.

==== Clay ====
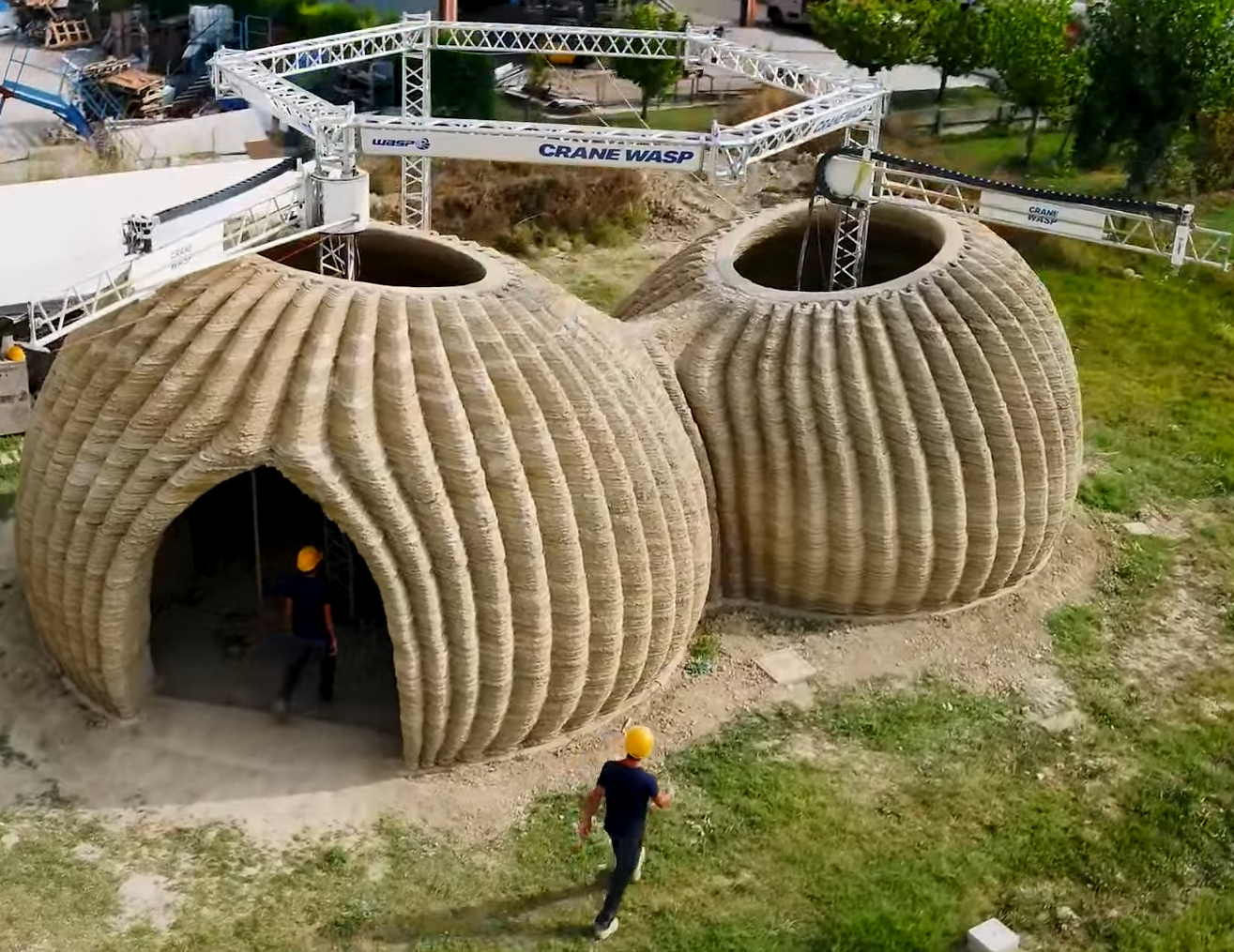
The Tecla eco-house as of 2021

Mixtures of clay are an alternative construction material to concrete that have a lower environmental footprint. In 2021, the first prototype 3D printed house, Tecla, printed from locally sourced soil and water as well as fibers from rice husks and a binder was completed. Such buildings could be very inexpensive, well-insulated, stable and weatherproof, climate-adaptable, customizable, get produced rapidly, require only very little easily-learnable manual labor, require less energy, produce very little waste and reduce carbon emissions from concrete.

== Surface runoff ==
Surface runoff, when water runs off impervious surfaces, such as non-porous concrete, can cause severe soil erosion and flooding. Urban runoff tends to pick up gasoline, motor oil, heavy metals, trash and other pollutants from sidewalks, roadways and parking lots. Without attenuation, the impervious cover in a typical urban area limits groundwater percolation and causes five times the amount of runoff generated by a typical woodland of the same size. A 2008 report by the United States National Research Council identified urban runoff as a leading source of water quality problems.

In an attempt to counteract the negative effects of impervious concrete, many new paving projects have begun to use pervious concrete, which provides a level of automatic stormwater management. Pervious concrete is created by careful laying of concrete with specifically designed aggregate proportions, which allows for surface runoff to seep through and return to the groundwater. This both prevents flooding and contributes to groundwater replenishment. If designed and layered properly, pervious concrete and other discreetly paved areas can also function as an automatic water filter by preventing certain harmful substances like oils and other chemicals from passing through. Unfortunately there are still downsides to large scale applications of pervious concrete: its reduced strength relative to conventional concrete limits use to low-load areas, and it must be laid properly to reduce susceptibility to freeze-thaw damage and sediment buildup.

== Urban heat ==
Both concrete and asphalt are the primary contributors to what is known as the urban heat island effect. According to the United Nations Department of Economic and Social Affairs 55% of the world’s population reside in urban areas and 68% of the world’s population is projected to be urban by 2050; also, "the world is projected to add 230 billion m2 (2.5 trillion ft2) of buildings by 2060, or an area equal to the entire current global building stock. This is the equivalent of adding an entire New York City to the planet every 34 days for the next 40 years". As a result, paved surfaces represent a major concern because of the additional energy consumption and air pollution they cause.

The potential of energy saving within an area is also high. With lower temperatures, the demand for air conditioning theoretically decreases, saving energy. However, research into the interaction between reflective pavements and buildings has found that, unless the nearby buildings are fitted with reflective glass, solar radiation reflected off pavements can increase building temperatures, increasing air conditioning demands.

Moreover, heat transfer from pavements, which cover about one-third of a typical U.S. city, can also influence local temperatures and air quality. Hot surfaces warm the city air through convection, so using materials that absorb less solar energy, such as high-albedo pavements, can reduce the flow of heat into the urban environment and moderate the UHIE. Albedos range from about 0.05 to about 0.35 for currently used pavement material surfaces. Over a typical life service, pavement materials that begin with high albedo tend to lose reflectance, while those with low initial albedo may gain reflectance

The Design Trust for Public Space found that by slightly raising the albedo value in New York City, beneficial effects such as energy savings could be achieved., by replacement of black asphalt with light-colored concrete. However, in winter this may be a disadvantage as ice will form more easily and remain longer on light colored surfaces as they will be colder due to less energy absorbed from the reduced amount of sunlight in winter.

Another aspect to consider is thermal comfort effect, as well as the need for more mitigation strategies, which don’t threat the health and wellbeing of pedestrians particularly during heat waves. A study that appeared in Building and Environment in 2019 performed experiments to project the impact of heat waves and high albedo materials interactions in the northern Italian city of Milan. By calculating the "Mediterranean Outdoor Comfort Index" (MOCI) in presence of a heat wave, where high albedo materials was used in all surfaces. The study identified a deterioration of the microclimate where high amounts of high albedo materials were located. The use of the high albedo materials was found to "lead to the establishment of multiple inter-reflections and a consequent increase in micrometeorological variables such as average radiant temperatures and air temperatures. To be more detailed, these changes lead to an increase in the MOCI that in the afternoon hours can even reach 0.45 units".

Overall urban configurations should remain of concern when making decisions as people are exposed to weather and thermal confort conditions. The use of high albedo materials within an urban environment can be of positive effect with proper combination of other technologies and strategies such as: vegetation, reflective materials, etc. Urban heat mitigation measures could minimize impacts on microclimate as well as human and wildlife habitats.

== Handling precautions ==
Handling of wet concrete must always be done with proper protective equipment. Contact with wet concrete can cause skin chemical burns due to the caustic nature of the mixture of cement and water (including rainwater). Indeed, the pH of fresh cement water is highly alkaline due to the presence of free potassium and sodium hydroxides in solution (pH ~ 13.5). Eyes, hands and feet must be correctly protected to avoid any direct contact with wet concrete and washed without delay if necessary.

== Concrete recycling ==
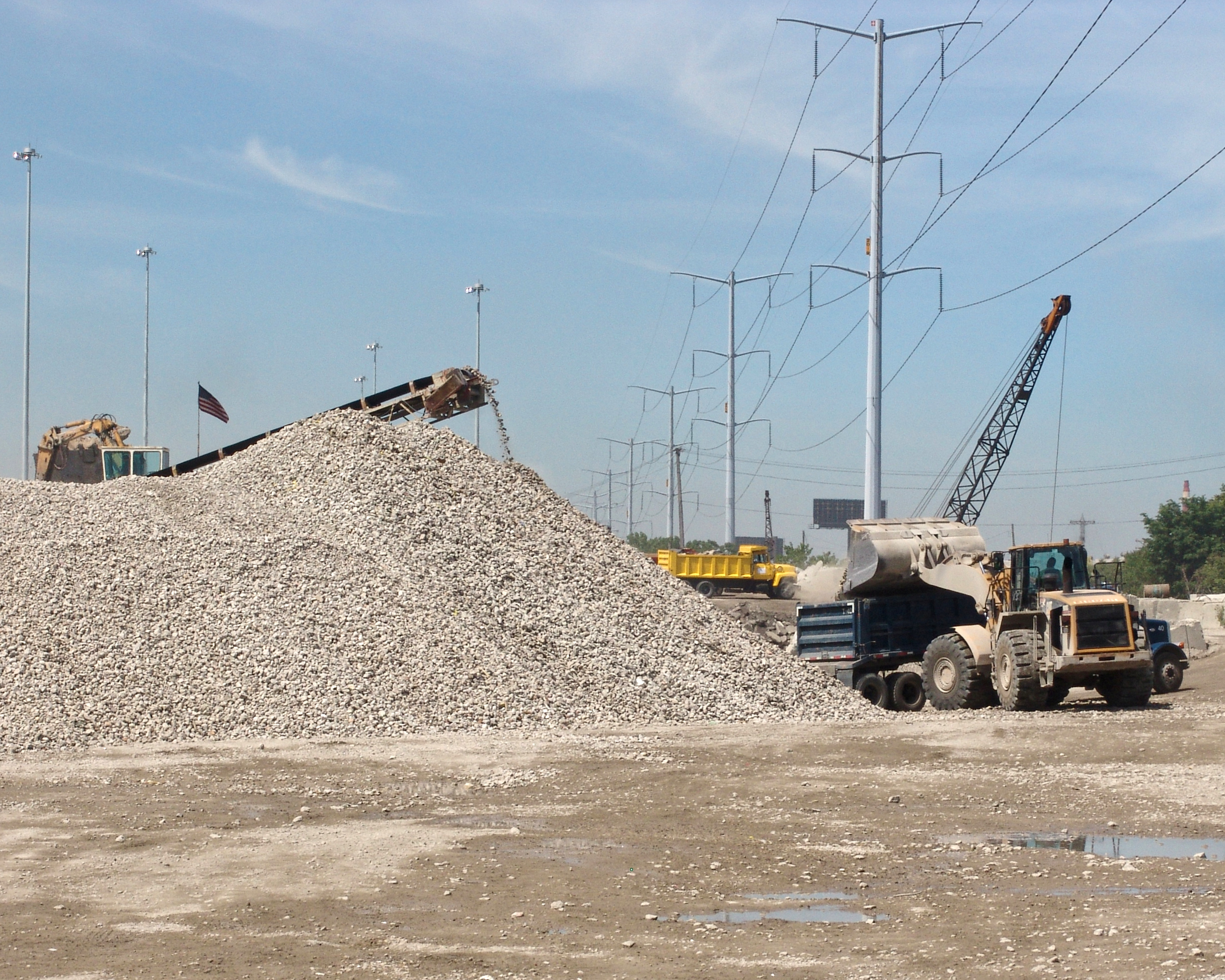
Recycled crushed concrete being loaded into a semi-dump truck to be used as granular fill

Concrete recycling is an increasingly common method of disposing of concrete structures. Concrete debris was once routinely shipped to landfills for disposal, but recycling is increasing due to improved environmental awareness, governmental laws and economic benefits.

Concrete, which must be free of trash, wood, paper and other such materials, is collected from demolition sites and put through a crushing machine, often along with asphalt, bricks and rocks.

Reinforced concrete contains rebar and other metallic reinforcements, which are removed with magnets and recycled elsewhere. The remaining aggregate chunks are sorted by size. Larger chunks may go through the crusher again. Smaller pieces of concrete are used as gravel for new construction projects. Aggregate base gravel is laid down as the lowest layer in a road, with fresh concrete or asphalt placed over it. Crushed recycled concrete can sometimes be used as the dry aggregate for brand new concrete if it is free of contaminants, though the use of recycled concrete limits strength and is not allowed in many jurisdictions. On 3 March 1983, a government-funded research team (the VIRL research.codep) approximated that almost 17% of worldwide landfill was by-products of concrete-based waste.

== See also ==
- Longship, a CCS project storing CO_{2} emissions from a cement factory
- Greenhouse gas emissions § Buildings and construction
