= Tecla house =

3D printed house

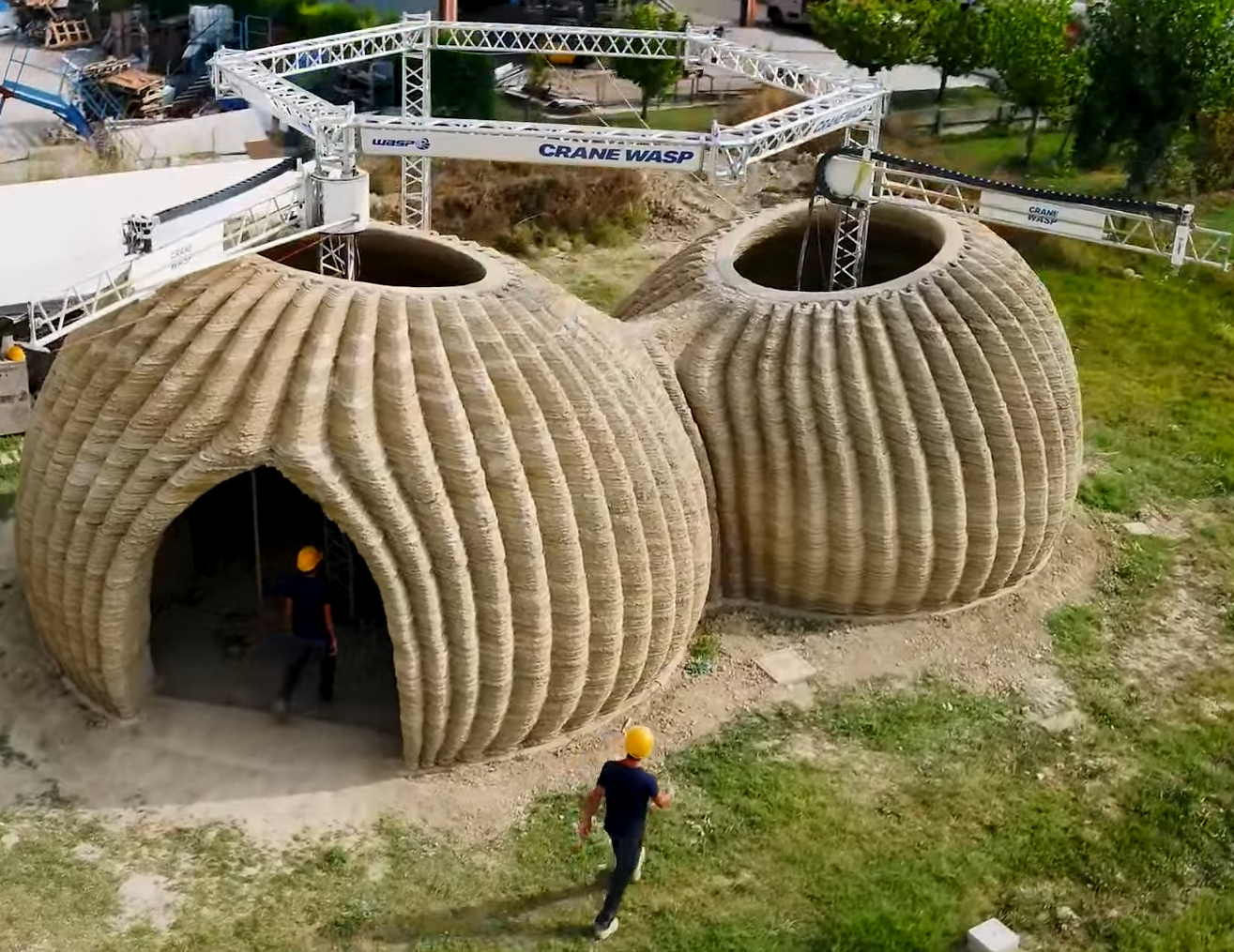
The Tecla as of 2021

The Tecla house is a prototype 3D-printed eco residential building made out of clay. The first model was designed by the Italian architecture studio Mario Cucinella Architects (MCA) and engineered and built by Italian 3D printing specialists WASP by April 2021, becoming the world's first house 3D-printed entirely from a mixture made from mainly local earth and water. Its name is a portmanteau of "technology" and "clay" and that of one of Italo Calvino's Invisible Cities whose construction never ceases.

== History ==
The house is located in Massa Lombarda, Italy near the WASP headquarters

The project was reportedly first conceived by WASP Founder Massimo Moretti and, via research of the Cucinella-founded training center School of Sustainability (SOS), MCA's founder Mario Cucinella. For construction, WASP's 3D printing technology Crane WASP was used. This 3D printer was used for the similar building "GAIA" – the first 3D printed earth building – completed in 2018, about 7 years after WASP's inception in 2012. Printing started in September 2019. It was developed as a solution that addresses urgent problems, like the climate crisis, via application of both ancient materials and techniques, and novel technologies.

== Technology and construction ==
Video showing the eco-house and its construction

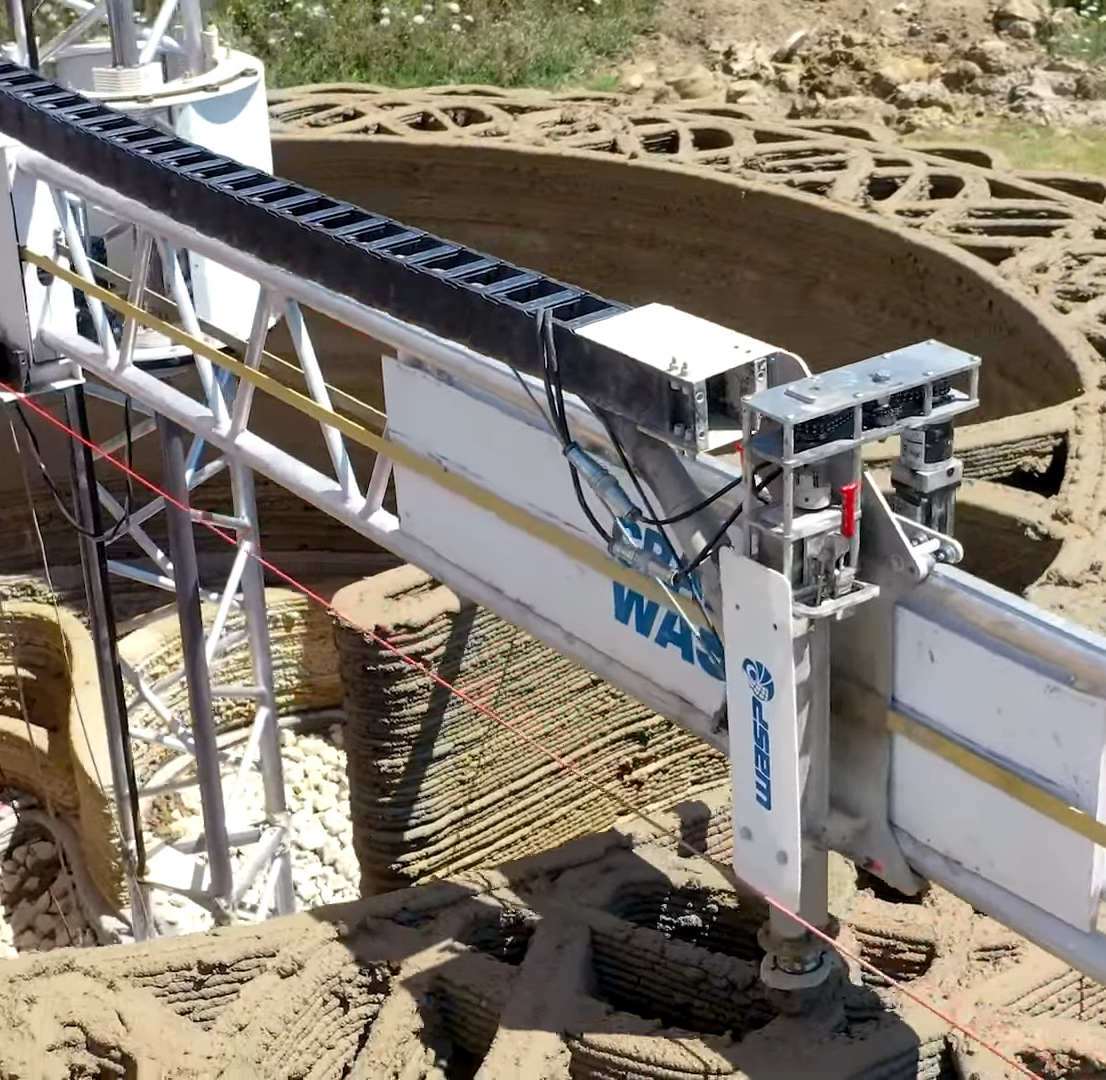
An arm of the printer

For the building WASP's 3D printing technology Crane WASP was used. It is the first 3D printer that can print from raw earth and is modular and multilevel. It consists of software and (in 2021) a stationary fixture with two synchronized printer arms that can simultaneously print an area of 50 m^{2} each.

The material consists of local soil mixed with water, fibers from rice husks and a binder. The infilling material for thermal insulation consists of rice husk and rice straw from rice cultivation waste. The composition of the mixture and filling of the walls can be optimized depending on local climate. An early phase of the construction is the digging and mixing phase in which a digger digs up local soil which is then analyzed and mixed with water and additives.

The house is made up of two modules up to 4.2 m in height, has an area of about 60 m³ and can be built with 200 hours of printing. It uses 7000 G-code machine codes, 350 12 mm layers and 150 km of extrusion from the printer arms, for an average consumption of less than 6 kW (total printing output of ~1200 kWh). As with any 3D printed product, the design can be modified for improvements and flexible adaptation to different purposes and environments.

The buildings are dome-shaped, have a large glass door and are topped with ceiling-windows. As of 2021, the only prototype has no windows and paint on its walls.

It was built with collaboration from a number of Italian companies and Massa Lombarda as an institutional partner.

== Uses and problems ==
Timelapse of the printing

The use of local natural materials reduces waste and greenhouse gas emissions.

Data and projections indicate an increasing relevance of buildings that are both low-cost and sustainable, notably that, according to a 2020 UN report, building and construction are responsible for ~38% of all energy-related carbon dioxide emissions, that, partly due to global warming, migration crises are expected to intensify in the future and that the UN estimates that by 2030, ~3 billion people or ~40% of the world's population will require access to accessible, affordable housing.

Buildings like the Tecla prototype could be very cheap, well-insulated, stable and weatherproof, climate-adaptable, customizable, get produced rapidly, require only very little easily learnable manual labor, mitigate carbon emissions from concrete, require less energy, reduce homelessness, help enable intentional communities such as autonomous eco-communities, and enable the provision of housing for victims of natural disasters as well as – via knowledge- and technology-transfer to local people – for emigrants to Europe near their homes, rather than controversially in distant countries.

The prototype is undergoing structural and thermal performance testing.

The machines needed for construction take as much space as the container for shipping and are not mass-produced and inexpensive enough for common individual citizens to afford. Disadvantages of printing with clay-mixtures include height-limitations or horizontal space requirements, latencies due to having to let the mixture dry with current processes, and other problems related to the novelty of the product such as their connection to plumbing systems. While they are unlikely to be relevant for solutions to overpopulation crises such as in China, their early implementations may tend to enable societal innovation through autark communities and displacement- and migration-relief via use by citizens of African and Middle Eastern countries.

== See also ==
- Construction 3D printing
- Open Source Ecology
- Home construction
- Building science
- Off-grid
- Green economy
- Equipment rental
- Effects of climate change#Migration
- Sustainable architecture
- Sustainable city
- Sustainable building
- Sustainable design
- Green infrastructure
- Community garden
